South African labour law regulates the relationship between employers, employees and trade unions in the Republic of South Africa.

History 
The Native Labour Regulations Act 1911 prohibited strikes by trade unions, introduced wage ceilings and a pass system for moving around jobs. Over 70,000 Chinese labourers were brought in, and used by landowners to undercut the wages of other workers. Among white workers, there was significant unrest, and major strikes took place in 1907, 1913, 1914 and 1922

For a period of sixteen years, from 1979 to 1995, several critical developments occurred in the field of labour law in South Africa, beginning with a radical change in the first of these years, when a significant Commission of Enquiry was held, resulting in the establishment of an Industrial Court, which was given extensive powers to mould, change, shape and develop the law. Prior to 1995, most labour relations were based on contracts. In 1995, much of the law developed by the Commission and the Industrial Court was put together in the Labour Relations Act 1995 (LRA). Since then, most labour law has been based on statute.

Prior to 1995, an employee could be dismissed in terms of the contract of employment, which could permit any reason for dismissal. Since 1995, an employee may be dismissed only for misconduct, operational reasons and incapacity. The Labour Relations Act 1995 is a pivotal piece of legislation, as it recognises the need for fast and easy access to justice in labour disputes. The Industrial Court had the status of a High Court, and therefore was not accessible to all labourers.

1995 also saw the introduction of the Commission for Conciliation, Mediation and Arbitration (CCMA) which is an administrative tribunal. The Commission for Conciliation, Mediation and Arbitration endeavours first and foremost to conciliate between the parties. If it is unsuccessful in this, the matter moves on to arbitration. The entire process is very informal, and at no charge, and is therefore very accessible to labourers, who often use it: About 300 new cases are brought before the Commission for Conciliation, Mediation and Arbitration daily. In addition to the Commission for Conciliation, Mediation and Arbitration, 1995 saw the introduction of bargaining councils, which allow for communication across the industry. A bargaining council is organised collectively and voluntarily, and must be registered. In order to be registered, an alternative-dispute-resolution mechanism, similar to the Commission for Conciliation, Mediation and Arbitration, must be put in place.

The Labour Relations Act 1995 also regulated the issue of fairness, not only in termination but during employment, too. In 1998, however, most of the law on unfair labour practices was removed from the Labour Relations Act 1995 and put into the Employment Equity Act (EEA). The EEA also deals with issues such as fairness regarding a worker's human immunodeficiency virus (HIV) status or disability, as well as the issue of affirmative action.

The Basic Conditions of Employment Act (BCEA), the Health and Safety Acts and the Skills Development Act, must be read with the EEA. The Skills Development Act provides that a small percentage of a labourer's salary must be contributed to the Department of Labour, enabling certain workshops to be run which are designed to develop skills.

Constitution 
Chapter 2 of the Constitution contains several provisions of relevance to employment and labour law:

 the right to equality
 protection of dignity
 protection against servitude, forced labour and discrimination
 the right to pursue a livelihood and
 protection for children against exploitative labour practices and work that is hazardous to their well-being.

It is important to interpret all labour legislation in light of the Constitution.

Section 23 of the Constitution deals specifically with labour relations, providing that everyone has the right to fair labour practices, and specifically the right

 to form and join a trade union;
 to participate in the activities and programmes of a trade union; and
 to strike

Every employer, meanwhile, has the right

 to form and join an employers’ organisation; and
 to participate in the activities and programmes of an employers’ organisation.

Every trade union and every employers’ organisation has the right

 to determine its own administration, programmes and activities
 to organise and
 to form and join a federation

Finally, every trade union, employers’ organisation and employer has the right to engage in collective bargaining.

Section 23(1) is an unusual provision—only South Africa and Malawi expressly protect the right to fair labour practices — as it is so broad and overarching. An exact definition of fair labour practices is impossible, since this is a dynamic field of the law, rooted in socioeconomic rights. Section 23(1) refers to "everyone," encompassing far more than merely employees and workers; it also includes would-be workers, employers and juristic persons.

Section 23 is not entirely universal, however, as soldiers are excluded from its ambit insofar as they may not strike at a time of war.

The Labour Relations Act was promulgated as the "national legislation" referred to in subsections 23(5) and 23(6), which provide respectively that "national legislation may be enacted to regulate collective bargaining," and that "national legislation may recognise union security arrangements contained in collective agreements." Both subsections stipulate that, to the extent that such legislation may limit one of the rights in section 23, the limitation must comply with section 36(1), the limitations clause of the Constitution.

The current Basic Conditions of Employment Act is also designed to give effect to the right to fair labour practices. Both Acts are bolstered by the EEA, which replicates the equality clause in the Constitution in its totality, adding that one may not discriminate on the basis of human immunodeficiency virus (HIV) status.

The general guarantee of fair labour practices has far-reaching effects on the civil courts’ approach to the interpretation of the rights of parties to employment contracts.

All courts are enjoined, when applying and developing the common law, to have due regard to the spirit, purport and objects of the Bill of Rights. This calls for a reconsideration of some of the assumptions underlying the common-law contract of employment, in particular the employer's power of command and unfettered rights in respect of promotion and dismissal.

Furthermore, the labour courts’ judgments on such contentious issues as the dismissal of striking workers are subject to review by the Constitutional Court, so long as the applicants have exhausted the procedures available to them under the labour legislation.

In NUMSA v Bader Bop, the Constitutional Court overturned a decision of the Labour Appeal Court which restrictively interpreted the Labour Relations Act 1995. The court recognised the necessity of collective bargaining and bargaining councils which facilitate the establishment of trade unions. The court held that minority unions may not strike in support of demands for organisational rights reserved in the Act for majority unions.

In NEHAWU v University of Cape Town, the Constitutional Court overturned another decision of the Labour Appeal Court which restrictively interpreted the Labour Relations Act 1995. It had been argued that the term "everyone" did not include a university or a company, but the court held otherwise. Furthermore, the court ruled that, under the original section 197 of the Labour Relations Act 1995, contracts of employment transferred automatically when businesses were transferred, irrespective of the wishes of the employers.

SANDU v Minister of Defence, another Constitutional Court, case Judge O’Reagan dealt with the concept of a "worker," and held that, although the Labour Relations Act 1995 does not apply to South African National Defense Force (SANDF) members, they are still "workers" in terms of the Constitution, which protects the rights of every person in South Africa.

Employment contract

Parties

Identification 

The first question to be asked, when seeking to resolve any labour law problem, is whether the parties are indeed "employees" and "employers" within the meaning of the applicable statute or the common law.

This has long been a difficult task in South Africa, as it is not always immediately apparent whether the parties have entered into the locatio conductio operarum (contract of employment) or merely the locatio conductio operis (contract of work).

Distinguishing between these two kinds of contracts is critically important, as different legal consequences flow from the various forms of contract. Most important is that South African labour legislation applies only in respect of employees, who are entitled to social security benefits and have access to the statutory mechanisms if they wish to seek remedies for violations of their employment rights. Similarly, only employers are bound by the labour statutes, and are vicariously liable for the delicts of their employees.

The Labour Relations Act, has through the S200A and the Code of Good Practice: Who is an employee, provided guidelines on the determination if a party is an employee. S200A sets out several requirements which if met makes the presumption if the person is an employee or not.

Common law 

The first source to be examined, when seeking to determine whether parties to a work relationship are employers and employees, is the contract into which they have entered.

A contract of employment comes into existence when the parties conclude an agreement that conforms to the requirements of the locatio conductio operarum. The contract of employment is traditionally defined as "a contract between two persons, the master (employer) and the servant (employee), for the letting and hiring of the latter's services for reward, the master being able to supervise and control the servant’s work."

This, however, raises the question of how much supervision or control is required to distinguish between employees and independent contractors.

Reported judgments have indicated that the task of distinguishing employees and employers from parties to other contractual relationships entailing the provision of work, or the rendering of services, is not a matter of definition; classification of such contracts is a "matter of substance, not merely of form."

The true nature of the contract, therefore, is determined from the relationship between the parties, not merely the label the parties have given their contract.

Statutes 

Statutory definitions do not resolve the problem. "Employee" is defined

 in section 213 of the Labour Relations Act 1995 as
 "any person excluding an independent contractor, who works for another person or for the State, and who receives, or is entitled to receive, any remuneration; and
 "any other person who in any manner assists in carrying on or conducting the business of an employer;"
 in section 1 of the Basic Conditions of Employment Act in exactly the same words; but
 in section 1 of the EEA as "any person other than an independent contractor who
 "works for another person or for the State and who receives, or is entitled to receive, any remuneration; and
 "in any manner assists in carrying on or conducting the business of an employer."

The difference between the Labour Relations Act 1995 and the EEA is that the Labour Relations Act 1995 excludes independent contractors only in section 213(a), while the EEA excludes independent contractors in both subsections. It is safe, however, to assume that even from the second part of the definition of an "employee," as it appears in the Labour Relations Act 1995 or the Basic Conditions of Employment Act, independent contractors are implicitly excluded.

At the core of subsection (a) of both definitions lies a reference to the contract of employment: one person working for another in exchange for some form of remuneration.

The basic idea behind subsection (b) of both definitions is that employees are those people who place their capacity to work at the disposal of others. This is the essence of employment.

The case of Liberty Life Association of Africa v Niselow reiterates the law set out above and the interpretation of the definition of "employee."

Courts 

Labour legislation does not define "contract of service" or the concept of "work" at all.

This means that it is necessary to look outside the legislation to determine the meaning of these terms, in order to distinguish between an employee and an independent contractor.

The courts have formulated a number of tests for drawing the distinction.

Control test 

The control test focuses on the element of "control" exercised by the employer over the employee.

The power to control has traditionally been regarded as the hallmark of the employment contract. With the advent of highly skilled employees who are given free rein in performing their duties, the courts no longer insist on de facto control, as once they did, but recognise that a right to control is sufficient.

The courts initially applied the requirement of a right to control rather strictly, as in R v AMCA Services, where the presiding officer spoke of "a right to control, not only the end to be achieved by the other’s labour and the general lines to be followed, but the detailed manner in which the work is to be performed."

It is now clear, however, that the courts have in mind, a right to control only in principal. The employer not choosing to exercise that right does not render the contract something other than one of employment.

The application of the control test in isolation is entirely inadequate, as certain employees have a wide discretion as to how to perform their work. Such discretion does not alone render them independent contractors.

The ultimate difference between an employee and an independent contractor is that the principal has no legal right to prescribe the manner in which the independent contractor brings about the desired result, but may prescribe methods by which the employee works. In Colonial Mutual Life Assurance Society v MacDonald, the court held that the employee was subject to the control of the employer in the sense that the latter had the right to prescribe not only what work had to be done, but also the manner in which that work had to be done. The independent contractor, on the other hand, could be directed only as to what work must be done, not how it was to be done.

In any event, to define a contract in terms of one of its characteristics is tautological.

Organisation test 

The organisation test was developed in French law and adopted by South African law in R v AMCA Services and Another. It is based upon the assumption that whether or not one is an employee does not rest on submission to orders; it depends on whether the person is part and parcel of the organisation.

In other words, one looks at the extent to which a person (the worker) is integrated into the organisation of the other person (the employer), or whether the person is performing work inside the organisation of another.

The work of an independent contractor, although done for the business, is not integrated into it; it is only accessory to it.

If a person is incorporated into or related sufficiently to the organisation, that person will be regarded as an employee or a worker even though the employer might exercise little actual control over him.

One of the problems with this test is that it is not always possible to measure the extent of integration, or to determine what degree of integration is sufficient for someone to qualify as an employee.

The test was rejected by the Appellate Division in S v AMCA Services on the basis of it being too vague.

Multiple or dominant-impression test 

The deficiencies of the control and organisation tests led the courts to approach the question in the same way that they approach so many other problems: The relationship is viewed as a whole; a conclusion is drawn from the entire picture.

In Ongevallekommissaris v Onderlinge Versekeringsgenootskap AV-BOB, although the court did not spell out exactly what may be included in the general picture, guidance may be derived from the English case of Ready Mixed Concrete v Minister of Pensions and National Insurance, in which the presiding officer set out three possible components:

 The servant agrees that, in consideration of a wage or other remuneration, he will provide his own work and skill in the performance of some service for his master.
 He agrees, expressly or impliedly, that in the performance of that service he will be subject to the other's control in a sufficient degree to make that other master.
 The other provisions of the contract are consistent with its being a contract of service.

When courts examine the "other provisions of the contract," they will consider all relevant aspects of the relationship. These include:

 the form of the contract;
 the right to supervision (in other words, whether the employer has the right to supervise the person);
 the extent to which the worker depends on the employer in the performance of his duties;
 whether the employee is not allowed to work for another;
 whether the worker is required to devote a specific amount of time to his work;
 whether the worker is obliged to perform his duties personally;
 whether the worker is paid according to a fixed rate or by commission;
 whether the worker provides his own tools and equipment; and
 whether the employer has the right to discipline, suspend and dismiss the worker.

The decisive difference between the control test and the dominant-impression test is that, in the latter, the existence or absence of control is only one of the factors to be taken into account.

In Smit v Workmen's Compensation Commissioner, the court had to decide whether Smit, who had been employed as an "agent" for an insurance company, was an employee or not. He had been

 remunerated on a commission-basis;
 forbidden to perform certain acts (such as pledging the company's credit) without written authority;
 forbidden from working for another company at the same time, but was not required to work full-time and could do other work at different times;
 given the use of a company motor-car, but had to pay out of his own pocket for fuel and servicing;
 working closely with a manager, but there was a total absence of any right of supervision and control of Smit by the insurance company; and
 able to obtain assistance from others in performing his duties.

The dominant-impression test was followed in this case, and Smit was held to not be an employee of the insurance company.

In Medical Association of SA v Minister of Health, several district surgeons challenged the decision of the provincial MEC for Health for the Free State to terminate their contracts summarily as part of the restructuring of the district health service. The multiple or dominant impression test was followed, and the court used the factors discussed in Smit to assist it in obtaining the dominant impression that part-time district surgeons were in fact employees of the State.

The court held that the dominant-impression tests entails that one should have regard to all those considerations or indica which would contribute towards a determination of whether the contract is one of service or of work, and react to the impression one gets upon a consideration of all such indica. The Labour Court based its decision on the following factors:

 The doctors rendered "personal services."
 The doctors were expected to be "at the beck and call" of the employer 24 hours a day, and to give preference to official duties over those in their private practices.
 The employer was obliged to pay a "contractual salary" to the doctors even in the absence of any actual work being performed, as long as the doctors made themselves available to do the work.
 Even though the doctors were professionals, the provincial administration did have some control over the way in which services were rendered.

The test has been subjected to severe criticism. Etienne Mureinik has said that it test

offers no guidance in answering the (legal) question whether the facts are of such a nature that the individual may be held to be servant within the meaning of the common law in difficult (penumbral) cases. Indeed, it is no test at all. To say that an employment contract is a contract which looks like one of employment sheds no light whatsoever on the legal nature of the relationship.

This criticism is based on the idea that it is not helpful to say a particular relationship exists because it looks like it does.

Productive capacity test 

In other decisions, the courts appear to have resorted to what may be described as the "productive capacity" test.

This test was formulated in Martin Brassey's article "The Nature of Employment" in the following terms:

The independent contractor “sells the job” whereas the employee “sells his hands” [... E]mployment is a relationship in which one person is obliged, by contract or otherwise, to place his or her capacity to work at the disposal of another [... A]n employee is to be distinguished from an independent contractor, who undertakes to deliver, not his or her capacity to produce, but the product of that capacity, the completed work.

Differences between employees and independent contractors 

In SA Broadcasting Corporation v McKenzie, the Labour Appeal Court summarised the main differences between the contract of employment proper and what is called the "contract of work" (locatio conductio operis):

 In the first, the object is the rendering of personal services between employer and employee; in the second, the object is the production of a certain specified service or the production of a certain specified result.
 The employee renders the service at the behest of the employer; the independent contractor is not obliged to perform his work personally, unless otherwise agreed.
 The employer may decide whether it wishes to have employee render service; the independent contractor is bound to perform specified work or produce a specified result within a specified or reasonable time.
 The employee is obliged to obey lawful, reasonable instructions regarding work to be done, and the manner in which it is to be done; the independent contractor is not obliged to obey instructions regarding the manner in which a task is to be performed.
 A contract of employment proper is terminated by the death of the employee; the contract of work is not terminated by the death of the contractor.
 A contract of employment terminates on completion of the agreed period; the contract of work terminates on completion of the specified work, or on production of the specified result.

Labour Relations Act 1995 s 200A 

There is very little work that cannot be outsourced. Outsourcing is generally not supported by trade unions, who represent employees. If work is outsourced, the worker is an independent contractor. Political pressure was placed on government to move away from outsourcing and more towards employment.

In 2002, accordingly, a new presumption was added to the Labour Relations Act 1995, providing guidelines on when it has to be ascertained whether or not someone is an employee. This presumption was introduced as a part of significant amendments to the Labour Relations Act 1995 and the Basic Conditions of Employment Act in 2002.

The effect of this rebuttable presumption is that, if one or more of the list of factors is present, the person is presumed to be an employee unless and until the contrary is proven. Many of the factors and issues discussed by the courts in the cases above resurface again: The presumption is thus created

 if the manner in which the person works is subject to the control or direction of another person;
 if the person's hours of work are subject to the control or direction of another person;
 if, in the case of a person who works for an organisation, the person forms part of that organisation;
 if the person has worked for that other person for an average of at least forty hours per month over the last three months;
 if the person is economically dependent on the person for whom he works or renders services;
 if the person is provided with tools of trade or work equipment by the other person; and
 if the person only works for or renders services to one person.

The legislative provision has been taken by some to be merely a restatement or summary of the principles laid down by the courts with the passing of time.

Although this presumption is useful in determining whether a person is an employee or not, as it is closely linked to the principles and approaches developed by the courts, the Labour Court held, in Catlin v CCMA, that section 200A does not do away with the principle that the true nature of the relationship between the parties must be gathered from the contract between them. Section 200A is not the starting point, therefore; the court held that it is necessary to consider the provisions of the contract before applying the presumptions.

Essentials 
The common-law concept of employment sets the scene for the interpretation of the Labour Relations Act 1995.

The contract of employment is the foundation of the relationship between an employee and his employer. It links the two parties in an employment relationship, irrespective of the form the contract takes.

The existence of an employment relationship is the starting point for the application of all labour law rules. Without an employment relationship between the parties, the rules of labour law do not apply.

The origin of South Africa's modern contract of employment lie in Roman law, where a distinction was made between the two types of contracts discussed above: locatio conductio operis and locatio conductio operarum.

In terms of the common law, one does not have to have a written contract; therefore, not having the contract in written form is not a fatal flaw, as the contract can be verbal. There are, however, a number of statutes which require specific contracts of employment to be in writing. Section 29 of the Basic Conditions of Employment Act, for example, states that the employer must supply the employee with certain written particulars concerning specific things, like hours worked and remuneration.

Like any contract, the locatio conductio operarum commences when the parties have agreed to its essential terms, unless both parties have agreed to suspend its operation for a particular period. If the contract's operation is suspended, the employer is obliged to allow the employee to commence work on the specified date. Failure to do so, without good cause, constitutes a breach of contract at common law and a dismissal under the Labour Relations Act 1995. It is important, therefore, to determine what the essentials of the contract of employment are.

Stripped to its essence, the contract of employment today may be defined as an agreement between two parties, in terms of which one party (the employee) works for another (the employer) in exchange for remuneration. Although this definition appears to be simple, it contains a number of important principles, aspects and implications. When they are taken into account below, the definition of the employment contract may be expanded as follows:

The contract of employment is a voluntary agreement between two legal personae (the parties) in terms of which one party (the employee) places his or her personal services or labour potential at the disposal of the other party (the employer) for an indefinite or determined period in exchange for some form of fixed or ascertainable remuneration, which may include money and/or payments in kind. This entitles the employer to define the employee’s duties and to control the manner in which the employee discharges them.

Agreement 
Firstly, it must be noted that the employment contract is based on agreement; the parties must enter into it voluntarily. This idea finds expression in section 13 of the Constitution, which provides that "no one may be subjected to slavery, servitude or forced labour," and section 48 of the Basic Conditions of Employment Act, which states that "all forced labour is prohibited."

Another implication of the fact that the employment contract is based on agreement is that it is a contract, and therefore must comply with the requirements of our law for a valid contract. If it does not comply with these requirements, it will not be regarded as binding and enforceable.

Consensus between the parties means that both must have a serious intention to create mutual rights and duties to which they will be legally bound. They must have each been fully aware of the nature of the duties, and that the other had this intention.

At common law, the parties are not required to observe any formalities. There is no requirement that the contract be in writing, but certain employment contracts are required by statute to be in writing, like those of merchant seamen and learners under the Skills Development Act. In addition, those of apprentices and candidate attorneys must also be registered with the appropriate authorities. Lastly, where parties wish to alter provisions of the Basic Conditions of Employment Act, this must be done in writing.

Work 
Secondly, one of the pivotal concepts in the initial definition is that of work. Generally, to work means to place one's labour potential at the disposal and under the control of another. This means that, when we work, we offer our services to another person, and agree that the other person will be able to tell us what to do, when to do it, how to do it and where to do it.

To place your labour potential at the disposal of another means to offer your ability to perform certain tasks to another person, and to offer, at the same time to follow that person's instructions.

Remuneration 
Remuneration normally takes the form of payment of money, or the provision of another benefit. (According to the common law, payment may be made in kind.)

Payment may be made monthly, weekly, daily or even in irregular cash payments. The common law does not prescribe what form payment must take.

The Labour Relations Act 1995 contains a statutory definition of remuneration in section 213: "any payment in money or in kind, or both in money and in kind, made or owing to any person in return for that person working for any other person, including the State."

The contract may state that remuneration is the "normal going rate for a specific type of work," or state a specific amount or merely "minimum wage."

The common law does not indicate minimum wages; these are usually set by collective-bargaining councils and are industry specific.

Reciprocity 
The contract of employment is a reciprocal contract. This means that one promise is made in exchange for another, and one obligation is incurred in exchange for the other. The employee works in exchange for remuneration; the employer remunerates the employee in exchange for the employee offering to place his labour potential at the disposal and under the control of the employer.

Summary 
To summarise, the essential elements of the employment contract are as follows:

 It is a voluntary agreement.
 There are two legal personae.
 The employee agrees to perform certain specified or implied duties for the employer.
 There is an indefinite or specified period.
 The employer agrees to pay a fixed or ascertainable remuneration to the employee.
 The employer gains a (qualified) right to command the employee as to the manner in which he carries out his duties.

Duties 
An employment relationship commences only when the parties conclude a contract of service. Prior to this, neither party has any rights against the other; they are merely a prospective employee and a prospective employer.

There are, however, two statutory exceptions to the principle that employers have no obligations to applicants for employment:

 The EEA prohibits direct or indirect unfair discrimination against an employee or applicant for employment on the basis of race, colour, gender, sex, religion, political opinion, ethnic or social origin, sexual orientation, age, disability, religion, conscience, belief, culture, language, family responsibility, marital status or any other arbitrary ground.
 The Labour Relations Act 1995 and the Basic Conditions of Employment Act protect both employees and persons seeking employment against discrimination for exercising rights conferred by the Acts.

Employer 
In addition to the three principal duties of the employer, discussed below, employers are further obliged to accord employees their rights in terms of the applicable contracts of service, collective agreements and legislation, as well as to adhere to certain statutory duties imposed in the interests of employees.

Receipt into service 
The employer's obligation to receive the employee into service is the corollary of the employee's duty to enter and remain in service.

The duty to receive employees into service does not mean that employers must necessarily provide employees with work to keep them busy, although this general rule is subject to some exceptions: where, for example, remuneration is based on the volume of work done, as in the case of piece-workers or salespersons working on commission, or where the failure to allow the employee to work degrades his status. A duty to provide work may also arise where the employer has contracted to train the employee in a particular profession or trade, as in the case of article clerks and apprentices.

The common law permits the suspension of an employee, suspected of some form of grave misconduct, while the matter is being investigated, but the employee is entitled to his remuneration during the period of suspension.

Employers may deny their employees access to the workplace, or otherwise prevent them from working, in the course of collective bargaining. This is known as a "lock out," and is the employer's equivalent of the employees’ strike. If a lock-out is lawful—if, that is, it complies with the Labour Relations Act 1995—the employer is relieved of its obligation to pay the locked-out employees their wages.

Since the contract of employment is personal, one employer cannot compel an employee to work for another if the first employer has no work for him, unless the first employer's business is transferred as a going concern.

Payment 
This duty is so fundamental to the employment contract that the courts will assume, where there has been no agreement on remuneration, either that the contract is not a contract of employment, or else that the parties impliedly intended the payment of a reasonable sum according to the custom and practice of the industry and locality.

The duty to pay, and the commensurate right to remuneration, arises not from the actual performance of work, but from the tendering of service.

It has become a widespread practice for employers to make up remuneration "packages" for their higher-paid employees in a tax-effective way, by substituting various benefits (like housing and car allowances) for the cash component of the salary.

The periodicity of payment depends on the parties’ agreement or on custom.

An employer may not unilaterally deduct any amount from the remuneration to which an employee is entitled.

If the contract is terminated summarily for good cause, the employer must pay the employee for services rendered to the day of the dismissal. The same principle applies when the employee deserts mid-term before the end of a fixed-term contract or without proper notice.

Safe and healthy working conditions 
Under the common law, employers are obliged to provide their employees with reasonably safe and healthy working conditions.

The scope of this duty extends to providing proper machinery and equipment, properly trained and competent supervisory staff, and a safe system of working.

If the employer fails to meet with this obligation, affected employees are not in breach of contract if they refuse to work until the dangerous situation is corrected.

Under the common law, employees had to rely on delict if the employer did not ensure that the working conditions were safe and healthy, but this was viewed to be imprecise, and the Legislature intervened. The situation is now governed by the Occupational Health and Safety Act, 1993, which implements strict liability on the employer, and states how much must be paid to the employee if accidents occur.

Remedies 
If the breach is material, the employee may claim damages. Provided it is a material breach, the employee may also cancel the contract of employment.

The employee may also claim specific performance. This was seldom granted in the past but is now considered an option.

Finally, the employee may refuse to work, withholding labour until the contract is performed.

Employee

Entering and remaining in service 
The main obligation of the employee under the contract is to place his personal services at the disposal of his employer.

The tender of service is a prerequisite to and the corollary of the employee's right to claim payment of wages: "no work, no pay." The reverse also applies: "no pay, no work," so that employees who have not been paid may legitimately refuse to work without breaching their contracts.

If a number of workers engage in a concerted cessation of work for the purpose of obtaining some concession from their employer, they are deemed to be on strike. Under the common law, striking workers need not be paid. The common law also allowed employers summarily to dismiss striking employees, but this has since been changed by the Labour Relations Act 1995.

Subject to the right to take such paid leave as has been agreed upon or conferred by statute, once employees have entered service, they remain obliged to render service until the contract of employment ends.

If the employee fails to render service (by desertion, absenteeism, abscondment, unpunctuality, etc.), the employer is entitled to deduct from the employee's wage an amount proportional to the absence.

Reasonable efficiency 
Employees are deemed by law to guarantee impliedly that they are capable of performing the tasks they agree to perform, and that they will carry them out with reasonable efficiency.

Where an employer seeks assurances about employees’ competence before taking them into service, the employees are bound by any representations they may make, whether those professions of competence are made by the employees themselves, or in testimonials of which they are aware.

The standard of competence employers are entitled to expect of their employees depends on the capacities in which the employees are engaged and the status and seniority accorded them.

The test for the standard of competence is that of persons comparable with the employees in question, having regard to training, experience and any special claims the employee might have made regarding his competence.

Where an employee has warranted that he possesses a particular degree of skill, he must satisfy that representation.

Furthering employer’s business interests 
Employees are obliged to devote their energies and skills to furthering their employer's business interests. They must devote all their normal working hours to the employer's business; they may not, without the employer's permission, simultaneously work for another employer during the hours they are contractually obliged to devote to their employer's needs.

These duties arise because the relationship between the parties is of a fiduciary nature: Employees may not place themselves in positions where their own interests conflict with those of their employers and may not, by exercising their powers of agency, acquire interests or benefits without the knowledge of their employers.

The interests of Employees must be bona fide: They may not work for another employer if its business interests are in conflict with those of the principal employer.

In the absence of a contrary provision in the contract, there is nothing to preclude employees from holding two compatible jobs, provided the second is not conducted during the working hours they are obliged to devote to the first job. Contractual provisions limiting employees’ moonlighting activities are, however, permissible.

In addition, employees may not compete with their employer's business for their own account.

Respect and obedience 
Respect and obedience are regarded as an implied duty of every employee. Absence of the former renders the interpersonal relationship between employer and employee intolerable; denial of the latter undermines the employer's right to decide how its employees will work.

The courts require all employees to show a reasonable degree of respect and courtesy to their employers, and to obey their employers’ reasonable and lawful instructions.

Respect, being a disposition, is a quality that is difficult to define with precision. It is not to be equated with deference in a manner compatible with the subordinate position in which the employee by definition stands vis-à-vis the employer.

Mere failure on occasion to greet the employer or superiors will not place employees in breach of their obligation to show respect. Disrespect must be gross if it is to justify termination of the employment relationship, or so frequent as to suggest that the employee has repudiated the employer's lawful authority, or that it has rendered the continuation of the employment relationship "intolerable."

Each case must be considered on its own merits to establish whether these inferences may be drawn.

Unless insolence is particularly gross, the proper sanction is a written warning in the first instance.

The employee's duty of obedience applies only to work-related orders and generally during working hours and to those orders which are lawful and reasonable.

Employees are also entitled to disobey instructions that would subject them to personal dangers not normally connected with the performance of their duties.

An order is unlawful if it requires the employee to perform an illegal act or to do something that falls outside the scope of the contractual relationship.

Refraining from misconduct generally 
Any misconduct that renders the continuation of the employment relationship intolerable or unworkable, or undermines trust and confidence between employer and employee, is regarded as sufficient to justify dismissal, provided it is serious enough to offset the importance which the courts otherwise attach to the work security of employees. Examples of misconduct are insubordination, theft, fraud.

With regard to misconduct committed before the formation of the conduct (like the commission of a serious crime), the general principal is that there is no duty on prospective employees to disclose prejudicial information from their past to their future employers unless they are specifically asked to do so.

A duty may arise, however, where the non-disclosure is material and amounts to fraud. Whether or not an employee may be dismissed for non-disclosure depends on whether or not the employment relationship can reasonably be sustained after the discovery of the past misdeed.

Remedies 
The employer may only dismiss the employee summarily for misconduct, incapacity or operational requirements. If damages are incurred as a result of a breach of one of these duties, the employer may claim compensation.

Basic employment rights 
The Basic Conditions of Employment Act is aimed at low-income earners: those who earn less than R193,805 per annum.

No matter what the contract itself says, the Basic Conditions of Employment Act is applicable as the minimum standard that must be achieved.

The Labour Relations Act 1995 deals with strikes and unions and the like; the Basic Conditions of Employment Act is a fall back option for those vulnerable workers who are not able to unionize due to various reasons, such as the kind of work they do. Domestic and farm workers are pertinent examples in the South African context.

The purpose of the Basic Conditions of Employment Act is to advance economic development by providing basic conditions of employment.

The Basic Conditions of Employment Act also contains the definition of an employee, so that issue, discussed above, is relevant here, too. The Minister is empowered to extend the provisions of the Basic Conditions of Employment Act to non-employees in specific circumstances. Even, therefore, if a domestic worker is not considered an employee in terms of the Basic Conditions of Employment Act, the Minister may extend the provisions to her for her own protection.

Minimum Wage 

The employer has no discretion to pay less than the minimum wage. As noted above, the Basic Conditions of Employment Act provides the minimum standard to be achieved; employers must, at the very least, abide by the Basic Conditions of Employment Act.

Minimum wages are the result of bargaining councils in most circumstances, but some professions have no bargaining councils.

South Africa enforced the National Minimum Wage Act which sets the foundation for a living wage across South Africa.

Hours 

A maximum of 45 hours per week is allowed to be worked. These stipulations (regarding hours) are not applicable on the following persons:
 a person that earns more than R211,596.30 per year; or
 a person in a senior management position; or
 Sales personnel, employees are required to travel in the performing of their duties, and people that can determine their own work hours.

Overtime 

Overtime is permitted on the basis of a voluntary agreement.

Overtime is restricted to 10 hours per week or 3 hours on a day.

Payment for overtime is 1½ times the normal wage, or the equivalent paid time off.

Sundays 

Payment for working on a Sunday is twice the normal wage if the employee is not expected in terms of his/her contract to work on Sundays, however if the employee is expected to work on Sundays in terms of his or her contract, the employee shall receive 1.5 times the normal wage.

Public holiday 
A worker is entitled to double pay only if it is stipulated in the employee's contract that he/ she is expected to work on public holidays.

In accordance with the Public Holiday Act, an employee can exchange the day worked on a Public Holiday for another day.

Meal intervals 

An employee is entitled to one hour off after 5 consecutive hours of work.

An employees meal interval can be reduced to 30 minutes by mutual consent.

Weekly rest periods 

An employee is entitled to 36 consecutive hours off. Issues such as night work, holidays and public holidays are also covered.

Sick leave 

An employee is entitled to 6 weeks off over a three-year period.

During the first 6 months of employment, an employee is entitled to 1 paid sick leave day for every 26 days worked.

Sick leave can only be utilised where the employee is unable to work due to illness or injury.

Maternity leave 

An employee is entitled to four months off in total, the leave must start at least 4 weeks prior to the expected birth date, and end at least 6 weeks after the expected date of birth. It does not, however, stipulate that this is paid leave. In terms of the Unemployment Insurance Fund, when a woman is on maternity leave, she is entitled to Unemployment Insurance Fund benefits for half the time spent away. Usually the employer will pay the other half, but this is not required in the Basic Conditions of Employment Act.

Family-responsibility leave 

If the employee has been working for more than four months, he is entitled to 3 days family-responsibility leave, as in the case where there has been a death in his/her immediate family. Furthermore, in case where the employees child is ill.

Remuneration 

Employers must keep records of the hours worked and remuneration awarded for each employee for at least three years.

Employees are to be paid in South African currency at the place of work (unless this is altered in the contract).

Employers may not deduct money from employees unless prior consent in writing is obtained.

Regarding severance pay, in cases of retrenchments or dismissals for operational reasons, employees are entitled to one week's pay for every year worked.

Variations 

The Basic Conditions of Employment Act is the very minimum standard required by employers. Employers may award more, but never less, than what is stipulated.

If an employer gives more than the minimum, he may be locked into always giving more, as he must then abide by the required annual increases, which are based on a percentage of the current pay.

An employer may vary the provisions in the contract by

 individual agreement; or
 collective agreement on an industry-wide basis.

Unfair labour practices 
In the past, the concept of "unfair labour practice" was broadly defined. The Industrial Court (a specialist tribunal that exercised jurisdiction over alleged unfair labour practices) took several innovative approaches. The court formulated a set of rules to govern unfair dismissals. These rules are now contained in Chapter VIII of the Labour Relations Act 1995 and in the Code of Good Practice: Dismissal.

The employment relationship has three stages:

 the beginning, when the employee is an applicant for employment;
 the middle, which continues as long as the relationship continues; and
 the end, which may take the form of dismissal, resignation or retirement.

Unfair conduct by the employer at the beginning of the relationship normally takes the form of unfair discrimination. Unfair conduct by the employer at the end of the relationship normally takes the form of unfair dismissal. Unfair conduct by the employer during the subsistence of the relationship will take the form of unfair labour practice.

Section 186(2) of the Labour Relations Act 1995 defines an "unfair labour practice" as "an unfair act or omission that arises between an employer and an employee," and involves

 unfair conduct by the employer relating to the promotion, demotion, probation or training of an employee, or relating to the provision of benefits to an employee;
 the unfair suspension of an employee, or any other unfair disciplinary action short of dismissal;
 a failure or refusal by an employer to reinstate or re-employ a former employee in terms of any agreement; and
 an occupational detriment, other than dismissal, in contravention of the Protected Disclosures Act, on account of the employee's having made a protected disclosure defined in that Act.

Scope of protection 

The first part of section 186(2) speaks of an unfair labour practice as any unfair act or omission that arises between an employer and an employee. Only persons who are already in employment, therefore, enjoy protection against unfair labour practices; only persons, that is, who fall within the definition of "employee."

This concept may also cover ex-employees, if an employer refuses or fails to re-employ a former employee in terms of an agreement, for example.

Exhaustive list 

Due to the use of the word "involving," the courts have held that the list of unfair labour practices, contained in section 186(2), is exhaustive. Therefore, the definition of "unfair labour practice" in the current Labour Relations Act is considerably narrower than that of its predecessor, the Labour relations Act of 1956. This is because concepts such as unfair discrimination have been removed from its ambit and included in the EEA.

The fact that the list is exhaustive raises three issues, as the Constitution expressly affords everyone the right to fair labour practices:

 whether the limitation of the constitutional right is justifiable, which according to the general consensus it is;
 the actual interpretation of this definition; and
 the freedom of employees to rely directly on the Constitution, as opposed to the current Labour Relations Act.

With regard to the interpretation of this definition, the general principal is that legislation that limits constitutional rights must be interpreted in such a way as to minimise the limitation. The definition must be interpreted so as to give the maximum possible protection.

With regard to the freedom to rely directly on the Constitution, employees may rely directly on the Constitution to challenge practices not covered by the Labour Relations Act 1995, like transfers. This issue, however, remains to be developed by the courts.

Promotion and demotion

Basic principles 

Many cases have been referred to the Commission for Conciliation, Mediation and Arbitration and the courts in this regard. From these cases, three main issues arise:

 the meaning of "promotion" and "demotion;"
 the unfairness of the employer's conduct; and
 remedies.

Meaning 

Employers commonly use one of two systems to promote employees:

 level progression, whereby employees are evaluated on a regular basis and progress to a higher level within the parameters of the job in question; and
 the application-for-vacancies system, whereby vacancies are advertised, and both current employees and external applicants are invited to apply for posts.

The second system is problematic. The Commission for Conciliation, Mediation and Arbitration and the courts have held that it is not promotion at all, as the employee is nothing other than a job applicant.

Firstly, in order to constitute a dispute concerning promotion or demotion, the aggrieved individual must be an employee of the employer to which he wishes to take action.

Secondly, one must compare the current job held by the employee with the job applied for.

Factors which are taken into account include any difference in remuneration levels, fringe benefits, status, levels of responsibility or authority or power, and the level of job security.

In Mashegoane v University of the North, the dispute was whether the university's refusal to appoint a lecturer to the position of Dean of a faculty involved a promotion. The legislation governing the university provided that Deans were appointed by the Senate acting on the recommendation of the Faculty Board. The university argued

 that the position of the Dean was not applied for; and
 that it was not a promotion; but
 that it was a nomination.

Once the court established that the applicant was a current employee, it found that his salary would have remained the same, but that he would have received a Dean's allowance and would have had a car at his disposal; these were the only benefits. His status would have been considerably elevated. He would have had more responsibilities, authority and powers. In light of this, the appointment amounted to a promotion.

In Nawa v Department of Trade and Industry, however, the court held that there was no promotion because there was no intention to change the existing terms and conditions of employment, even though there was an intention to change the way in which work was done.

Generally the Commission for Conciliation, Mediation and Arbitration and other institutions are quick to assume that there was indeed a promotion or demotion.

Disputes concerning Promotion and Demotion generally involve employees being denied a higher-level post within the structure of the employer's organization or being stripped of status or benefits.

Unfairness 

Generally, unfairness implies a failure to meet an objective standard, and includes arbitrary, capricious or inconsistent conduct, regardless of whether it is intentional or negligent.

Mere unhappiness on the part of the employee is not unfair.

With regard to substantive fairness, it may be difficult to justify the choice of a particular candidate in precise terms. An employer is at liberty to take into account subjective factors, such as performance at an interview, when considering an appointment or promotion. The employer must still provide reasons, however.

With regard to procedural fairness, the employer must follow its own procedures: If there is a practice of advertising the posts, it may not, without good reason, depart from that policy. An employee may challenge the composition and competency of a selection panel.

Examples of unfairness include bias, nepotism and erroneous exclusion of an employee from a shortlist due to a mistake by the employer or selection committee.

Remedies 

The relief must be determined on terms deemed reasonable by the Commissioner.

Relief may be in the form of a declaratory order, protective promotion, remitting the matter back to the employer for reconsideration, and reinstatement to a previous position (in the case of demotion).

Probation 
Guidelines may be gathered from the rules which govern the obligations of the employer before a fair decision to dismiss on the grounds of poor performance is reached, and also from the Code of Good Practice: Dismissals.

In this context, unfair conduct may include the failure to inform the employee properly about required performance standards, and the failure by an employer to afford the employee reasonable guidance, evaluation, training, counselling and instruction.

Provision of benefits 
An employer may commit an unfair labour practice through unfair conduct relating to the provision of benefits.

This provision, contained in section 186(2)(a) of the Labour Relations Act 1995, does not appear to be problematic, but it has been beset by considerable uncertainties regarding the interpretation of "benefits."

Early decisions of the Commission for Conciliation, Mediation and Arbitration attached a wide meaning to the term "benefits."

The problem is complicated by section 65(1)(c) of the Labour Relations Act 1995, which provides that employees may not strike over issues that may be referred to arbitration in terms of the Labour Relations Act 1995. A dispute over "benefits" may be referred to arbitration. If "benefits" is given a wide meaning, and is taken to include remuneration, this would mean that employees may not strike over wages and salaries.

There are two approaches to resolving the problem of interpretation:

 focus on the meaning of the word "benefit," and try define it; or
 focus on the nature of the dispute itself, bearing in mind the distinction between disputes over rights and disputes over interests.

Generally the courts take a narrow approach to interpretation. They apply a combination of the two approaches above. It has been held that the term "benefits" in the definition of an unfair labour practice includes only benefits ex contractu and ex lege: benefits that already exist in terms of a contract or law.

There is growing support for the notion that unfair labour practices should include not only disputes of right, but also disputes where there is an expectation of a right.

Training 
This prohibition has had little effect in practice. In view, however, of the obligations placed on employers in terms of the EEA and Skills Development Act, it may become more important in the future.

Generally employees may challenge the denial of training where such training is a prerequisite for advancement in the workplace.

Unfair suspensions 
There are two types of suspension:

 preventative suspension, where disciplinary charges are being investigated against an employee, and the employer wants to suspend the employee pending the outcome of the disciplinary enquiry; and
 punitive suspension, where suspension is imposed as a disciplinary measure short of dismissal after the disciplinary hearing has been held.

In the context of section 186(2)(b), one must consider whether both types of suspension are covered, and what the requirements for a fair suspension are.

Initially the view was taken that only punitive suspensions fell within the scope of the "unfair labour practice," but this view was rejected by the Labour Court.

The Commission for Conciliation, Mediation and Arbitration follows the Labour Court's view and assumes jurisdiction over both punitive and preventative suspensions.

The practice of preventative suspension is not in itself unfair so long as there is substantive and procedural fairness when the employer takes this decision.

Substantive fairness in this context refers to the reason for the suspension. The employer must have a reason for believing that the suspension is necessary. This could be, for example, where the seriousness of the misconduct creates rumours and suspicion, necessitating a suspension of the employee in order for work to carry on smoothly, or where the employer has reason to fear that the employee in question may interfere with the investigation or the witnesses. It may also be that the employer fears another recurrence of the misconduct, or that the seniority and authority of the employee in question has a bearing on the matter.

Procedural fairness does not necessarily mean that the employee must be given a hearing before the suspension. At least, though, that the employer must inform him of the suspension, the reasons for it, and the conditions of the suspension.

As a general rule, the employer must continue remunerating the employee during the course of the suspension. If he were to cease remuneration, this would constitute a breach of contract.

Suspension without pay is generally only possible if the employee consents, or if this is provided by legislation or the contract of employment itself.

If the suspension is grossly unfair, the employee may seek reinstatement as a remedy.

Where the unfairness is less serious, the employee may seek an alteration of the conditions of the suspension or require that the employer hold a disciplinary hearing within a specified time.

Other disciplinary action short of dismissal 
Other disciplinary actions, like warnings, suspensions with or without pay, demotions and transfers, must also meet the requirement of fairness. The employer must be able to show that the warning, demotion or other disciplinary action was fair and appropriate in the circumstances.

Failure or refusal to reinstate 
Section 186(2)(c) of the Labour Relations Act 1995 protects employees against a "failure or refusal of an employer to reinstate or re-employ a former employee in terms of any agreement."

The wording is almost exactly the same as that in section 186(d), which deals with dismissal. Unlike section 186(2)(d), however, section 186(2)(c) does not deal with termination of employment; nor does it state that there must be an offer of re-employment to some employees and no offer in respect of others. Furthermore, section 186(2)(d) does not refer to an agreement; section 186(2)(c) does.

Protected disclosures 
Any occupational detriment an employee may suffer due to the making of a protected disclosure is an unfair labour practice.

"Occupational detriment" and "protected disclosure" are defined in the Protected Disclosures Act.

"Occupational detriment" includes, inter alia, being subjected to disciplinary action; dismissed, suspended, demoted, harassed or intimidated; transferred against one's will, refused transfer or promotion, etc.

Once it is established that the employee has suffered an "occupational detriment," it must be proved that the detriment was due to a protected disclosure. This means that there must be a protected disclosure, and that there must be causality between the disclosure and the detriment.

As far as causality is concerned, the Labour Relations Act 1995 requires that the detriment must be "on account of" the protected disclosure.

"Disclosure" is defined as "any disclosure of information regarding any conduct of an employer, or an employee of that employer, made by any employee who has reason to believe that the information concerned shows or tends to show one or more of the following:

 "that a criminal offence has been committed, is being committed or is likely to be committed;
 "that a person has failed, is failing or is likely to fail to comply with any legal obligation to which that person is subject;
 "that a miscarriage of justice has occurred, is occurring or is likely to occur;
 "that the health or safety of an individual has been, is being or is likely to be endangered;
 "that the environment has been, is being or is likely to be damaged;
 "unfair discrimination as contemplated in the Promotion of Equality and Prevention of Unfair Discrimination Act [...]; or
 "that any matter referred to [above] has been, is being or is likely to be deliberately concealed."

Generally, such disclosures become protected when they are made to certain persons and offices under certain conditions:

 it was made in good faith;
 the employee reasonably believes that it is substantially true; and
 it was not made for personal gain.

Furthermore, the employee must have reason to believe

 that, if disclosure is made to the employer, he will suffer an occupational detriment;
 that the information was previously disclosed, and no action was taken by the employer; or
 that the matter is exceptionally serious.

Not every disclosure made by an employee will be protected. Only gradually are the courts beginning to consider the nature of a protected disclosure and the protection to be afforded to employees.

In Grieve v Denel, the employee was busy preparing a report for the employer's board of directors relating to allegations of wrongdoing by a manager. The employee found himself charged with misconduct, suspended and told to attend a disciplinary enquiry. He approached the Labour Court for an interdict to stop the employer's taking disciplinary action. The court held that the disclosures the employee intended to make were in good faith, and that, if the allegations were true, they could indicate possible criminal conduct. The disclosures were held to fall within the ambit of protection. The employer was ordered not to proceed with the pending disciplinary action.

In CWU v Mobile Telephone Networks, the Labour Court held that an employee's accusation of fraud by management did not constitute a protected disclosure; it was merely the employee's opinion and was not supported by any facts.

Resolution of disputes 
The procedure for resolving unfair-labour-practice disputes is similar to the dispute resolution for unfair dismissals.

First, the dispute must be referred to a bargaining council (or the Commission for Conciliation, Mediation and Arbitration if there is no bargaining council) for conciliation.

If conciliation does not succeed, the matter may be referred to arbitration.

Unlike unfair dismissal disputes, unfair-labour-practice disputes are required, by section 191 of the Labour Relations Act 1995, to be referred within ninety days of the relevant act or omission, or ninety days from the date on which the employee became aware of the act or occurrence.

In terms of section 193(4) of the Labour Relations Act 1995, an arbitrator has the power to determine any unfair labour practice dispute on "reasonable terms," which may include ordering reinstatement, re-employment or compensation (of up to twelve months' pay).

The onus is on the employee to prove all the elements of the alleged unfair labour practice in question.

Discrimination law 
Seen generally, there are three mechanisms designed to protect the individual employee:

 protection against unfair dismissal;
 protection against unfair labour practices; and
 the setting of minimum conditions of employment in the Basic Conditions of Employment Act.

The fourth mechanism of protection is protection against unfair discrimination.

The Labour Relations Act 1995 was the first piece of legislation to deal with discrimination in the workplace.

The EEA also contains detailed provisions to counteract and eliminate discrimination in the workplace.

The Constitution, with its right to equality, provides an important constitutional context for employment equity. A consideration of this constitutional provision indicates that the elimination of discrimination has two bases:

 formal equality, or equality in treatment; and
 substantive equality, enshrined in the adoption of positive measures to empower previously disadvantaged groups in South African society; also known as "affirmative action."

Section 6 of the EEA contains the main thrust of the Act's prohibition against unfair discrimination. It provides that

no person may unfairly discriminate, directly or indirectly, against an employee, in any employment policy or practice, on one or more grounds, including race, gender, sex, pregnancy, marital status, family responsibility, ethnic or social origin, colour, sexual orientation, age, disability, religion, HIV status, conscience, belief, political opinion, culture, language and birth.

It is not unfair discrimination

 to take affirmative action measures consistent with the purpose of the Act; or
 to distinguish, exclude or prefer any person on the basis of an inherent requirement of a job.

Harassment of an employee is a form of unfair discrimination, and is prohibited on any of the above grounds.

Furthermore, the EEA places a positive duty on every employer to take steps to promote equal opportunity in the workplace by eliminating unfair discrimination in any employment policy or practice. In certain circumstances there may be a duty on the employer to take reasonable measures to accommodate certain groups of employees.

In this regard, the Code of Good Practice: Key Aspects of human immunodeficiency virus (HIV)/acquired immunodeficiency syndrome (AIDS) and Employment, together with the Code of Good Practice on the Employment of People with Disabilities, provides guidelines on how HIV/AIDS and disability should be dealt with and accommodated in the workplace.

This is the only legislative provision that mentions human immunodeficiency virus (HIV) status as a prohibited ground of discrimination. Its inclusion makes section 6 of the EEA even wider than section 9 of the Constitution.

Section 6 protects only an "employee," but it does not speak only of an employer; it provides that "no person" may discriminate. This is broader, and may include, inter alia, an independent pension fund or an independent medical aid scheme, or even a fellow employee.

In this regard, if an employee lodges a complaint of discrimination against another employee, and the employer does not consult in an attempt to eliminate the discrimination, the employer may be held liable.

The difference between discrimination and differentiation must always be kept in mind, as not all differentiations amount to discrimination. There may be a fair differentiation between employees on the basis, for example, of educational qualifications or experience or seniority.

Generally, differentiation will amount to discrimination if it is based on an unacceptable reason. Even if the discrimination suffered is not listed in section 6(1) of the EEA, it would amount to discrimination if, objectively, it is based on attributes and characteristics which have the potential to impair the fundamental human dignity of persons as human beings, or to affect them adversely in a comparably serious manner.

Once the employee has proven that there has been a differentiation, the EEA and Constitution provide that it is presumed to have been unfair discrimination. The employer then bears the onus of proving the differentiation to be fair.

Discrimination may be direct or indirect:

 It is direct when it is clearly and expressly based on one or more of the grounds listed in section 6 of the EEA.
 It is indirect when, although not express, discrimination occurs as a result of it, as when an employer imposes a gender-neutral criterion, such as height or weight, as a condition for employment, and this criterion indirectly has a disproportionate effect on women.

Harassment 

The EEA provides that harassment amounts to "a form of unfair discrimination," and as such is prohibited. The most prevalent forms of harassment encountered in the workplace are

 sexual harassment;
 racial harassment;
 sexual-orientation harassment; and
 religious harassment.

Of these, sexual harassment is by far the most common.

Sexual harassment 

The Code of Good Practice on Handling of Sexual Harassment Cases lists three types of conduct which could constitute sexual harassment:

 physical conduct ranging from touching to sexual assault and rape, and including a strip-search by or in the presence of the opposite sex;
 verbal conduct, including innuendoes, suggestions and hints, sexual advances, comments with sexual overtones, sex-related jokes or insults, graphic comments about a person's body (made to that person or in her presence), enquiries about a person's sex life, and even whistling at a person or a group of persons; and
 non-verbal conduct, including gestures, indecent exposure or the display of sexually explicit pictures or objects.

Another way to define sexual harassment is to consider the effect of the harassment. Three types of harassment may be so identified:

 quid pro quo harassment, which occurs when a person is forced into surrendering to sexual advances against her will, for fear of losing a job-related benefit;
 sexual favouritism, which occurs where a person in authority rewards only those who respond to his sexual advances; and
 hostile work environment harassment, which occurs when an abusive working environment is created.

The questions remain: From whose perspective does one analyse the conduct to see if it amounts to sexual harassment? What test does one apply? Does one look to the way in which the victim experienced the situation (a subjective test), or does one try to be more objective?

 A subjective test would rely exclusively on the perceptions of the victim. An obvious criticism of such a test is that some victims may be over-sensitive, and therefore cast the net too wide.
 A purely objective test, on the other hand, may be too narrow. The "reasonable man" test (which is, in terms of the common law, the generally applied "objective" test) implies reliance on male-dominated values.
 The "reasonable victim" test seeks to establish a compromise. It takes into account the experiences of the victim, the surrounding circumstances, and the question of fault on the part of the perpetrator.

Decided cases are inconsistent on which test should be used.

The Code of Good Practice states that sexual harassment is "unwanted conduct of a sexual nature." This implies a subjective test. It goes on to say, however, that sexual attention will only become sexual harassment

 if the behaviour is persistent;
 if the recipient has makes it clear that the conduct is considered offensive; or
 if the perpetrator should know that the behaviour is regarded as unacceptable.

The Code thus adopts a mixture of the subjective and the objective test.

Employer liability 

The EEA states that the employer may be held liable if he was made aware of the conduct but did nothing, or did not do everything that could be expected of a reasonable employer.

Furthermore, the Code provides that, as a first step in expressing concern about and commitment to dealing with the problem of sexual harassment, employers should issue a policy statement, stipulating the following:

 All employees, job applicants and other persons who have dealings with the business have the right to be treated with dignity.
 Sexual harassment in the workplace will not be permitted or condoned.
 Persons who have been or are being subjected to sexual harassment in the workplace have the right to lodge a grievance about it. Appropriate action will be taken by the employer.

The Code recommends that management be given a positive duty to implement the policy, and to take disciplinary action against employees who do not comply with it. A policy on sexual harassment should explain the procedure to be followed by employees who are victims of sexual harassment. The policy should also state the following:

 Allegations of sexual harassment will be dealt with seriously, expeditiously, sensitively and confidentially.
 Employees will be protected against victimisation and retaliation for lodging grievances, as well as from false accusations.

Finally, the Code recommends that policy statements on sexual harassment be communicated effectively to all employees.

Other remedies 

The employee who resigns due to sexual harassment may argue that this was a constructive dismissal, which would provide grounds for finding an automatically unfair dismissal.

A victim of harassment may institute a civil claim, based on delict, against the perpetrator; she may also institute a claim against the employer, based on the common-law principles of vicarious liability.

Medical testing 
The EEA prohibits medical testing of an employee, unless

 legislation requires or permits such testing; or
 the testing is justifiable.

Testing may be justifiable in the light of

 the medical facts;
 the employment conditions;
 social policy;
 the fair distribution of employee benefits; or
 the inherent requirements of a job.

Job applicants are also protected from medical testing.

The EEA prohibits "psychological and other similar assessments" of employees, unless such an assessment

 has been scientifically shown to be valid and reliable;
 is applied fairly to all employees; and
 is not biased against any employee or group of employees.

HIV/AIDS 
The EEA lists HIV status as one of the grounds on which an employee may not be discriminated against. South African Airways, for example, formerly had a policy of not employing HIV-positive employees as cabin attendants, partly because it believed that HIV-positive people could not have vaccinations, a requirement for international travel, and were at risk of infection, which might be transmitted to others.

In Hoffman v South African Airways, the court found that people living with HIV constitute a minority, to which society has responded with intense prejudice, stigmatization and marginalization. Society's response has forced many of them not to reveal their HIV status, for fear of such prejudice, and has thus deprived them of the help they would otherwise have received. This stigmatization the court considered an assault on their dignity.

The EEA is designed to counteract

 the need which employers may feel to test their employees for HIV/AIDS; and
 the concomitant risk of prejudice to employees who do test positive.

Such testing is prohibited unless it is held to be justifiable by the Labour Court, which may impose various conditions on such testing, including

 the provision of counselling;
 the maintenance of confidentiality;
 a limitation on the period of HIV-testing; and
 a limitation on the category of jobs or employees in respect of which such testing is authorized.

Employers may make HIV testing available to employees as part of a "wellness" program, provided that it takes place confidentially and on the basis of informed consent. Authorisation from the Labour Court is not required for such testing.

The EEA does not forbid anonymous testing undertaken for epidemiological purposes, or to establish the prevalence of HIV/AIDS among the workforce.

In Joy Mining Machinery v NUMSA, the court held that the following considerations should be taken into account in determining whether or not HIV testing is justifiable:

 the prohibition on unfair discrimination;
 the need for such testing;
 the purpose of such testing;
 the medical facts;
 the employment conditions;
 social policy;
 the fair distribution of employee benefits;
 the inherent requirements of the job; and
 the category or categories of jobs or employees concerned.

The court will also want to be informed about the following, which do not go to the question of justifiability, but which are also relevant to arriving at a proper decision:

 the attitude of the employees;
 the financing of the test;
 the preparations for the test;
 pre-test counseling;
 the nature of the proposed test and procedure; and
 post-test counseling.

There is also a Code of Good Practice on Key Aspects of HIV/AIDS and Employment, which provides guidelines to employers and employees on how to deal with HIV/AIDS in general.

With regard to HIV/AIDS and disability, the Code states that an employee who has become too ill to work may be dismissed on grounds of incapacity. A mental or physical impairment will constitute a disability only if it is "substantially limiting" in respect of entry into, or advancement in, employment.

Disputes about discrimination 
A dispute about unfair discrimination must be referred to the Commission for Conciliation, Mediation and Arbitration for conciliation within six months of the alleged discriminatory act or omission.

Disputes of this nature may not be referred to a bargaining council.

In referring the dispute to the Commission for Conciliation, Mediation and Arbitration, the referring party must indicate that it has made a reasonable attempt to resolve the dispute, depending on the circumstances.

If conciliation fails, the matter may be referred to the Labour Court, unless the parties consent to the jurisdiction of the Commission for Conciliation, Mediation and Arbitration for arbitration.

The Labour Court may make any appropriate order that is "just and equitable" in the circumstances, including compensation, damages, and orders directing the employer to take preventative steps.

Again, once the employee proves that there was discrimination, the onus shifts to the employer to prove that the discrimination was fair.

Affirmative Action 
Alongside the prohibition against unfair discrimination, affirmative action is the second cornerstone of the EEA.

According to section 2(b) of the EEA, the goal of affirmative action is to ensure the equitable representation of certain groups in all occupational categories and levels in the workplace.

"Equitable representation" is not defined in the EEA, but section 42 states that it may be determined by a consideration of

 the demographic profile of the economically active population, nationally and regionally;
 the pool of suitably qualified people in the designated groups from which the employer may reasonably be expected to promote or appoint employees; and
 the economic and financial factors relevant to the sector in which the employer operates.

Affirmative action is, by its very nature, a temporary measure. Once the goal of equality in the workplace has been achieved, the reason for the measure will fall away.

A potential beneficiary of affirmative action must meet two requirements:

 He must be "suitably qualified."
 He must be from a designated group.

There are, in this regard, four key definitions in the EEA:

 "Designated groups" are black people, women and people with disabilities.
 "Black people" include Africans, Colored people and Indians.
 "People with disabilities" are those who have a long-term physical or mental impairment which substantially limits their prospects of entry into (or advancement in) employment.
 A "suitably qualified person" is one who may be qualified for a job as a result of any of his formal qualifications, prior learning, relevant experience, or his capacity to acquire, within a reasonable time, the ability to do the job.

Employees from one of the designated groups may approach the Labour Court, citing unfair discrimination, to enforce a lack of affirmative action. The Labour Court has held, however, that there is no individual right to affirmative action, which is collective in nature.

Designated employers 
The prohibition of unfair discrimination applies to all employers, regardless of their size, but the affirmative-action provisions of the EEA apply only to "designated employers."

A "designated employer" is defined as follows:

 an employer who employs fifty or more employees; or
 an employer who employs fewer than fifty employees but whose annual turnover in any given year exceeds a certain level, like an employer in agriculture with a total annual turnover of R2,000,000;
 municipalities;
 organs of state; or
 an employer appointed as a designated employer in terms of a collective agreement.

Employers that do not fall within the ambit of this definition may still voluntarily indicate that they intend to comply with the Act.

Employment-equity plans 
The employment-equity plan is the centrepiece of the procedure for implementing affirmative action in the workplace.

A designated employer has to consult with the workforce on

 the conduct of an analysis of its employment policies, practices and procedures, as well as the working environment;
 the preparation and implementation of an employment-equity plan, which will achieve reasonable progress towards employment equity in the workforce; and
 the submission of reports to the Department of Labour.

The analysis described above must also contain a profile of the employer's workforce. Using this profile, the employer must determine the degree of under-representation of people from designated groups in the various categories and levels.

The employment-equity plan must include

 annual objectives;
 the affirmative-action measures that have to be implemented;
 annual timetables for the achievement of goals;
 the duration of the plan; and
 internal procedures to resolve disputes about the interpretation or implementation of the plan.

If there is an under-representation of people from designated groups, the plan must also outline

 the numerical goals to be achieved;
 the timetable within which these goals have to be achieved; and
 the strategies to achieve such goals.

A copy of the plan must be made available to employees. The designated employer must assign one or more senior manager the responsibility and authority and means to monitor and implement the plan.

Designated employers must submit reports to the Department of Labour:

 If fewer than 150 employees are employed, the report must be made every two years.
 If more than 150 employees are employed, the report must be made every year.

Designated employers are required to submit a statement to the Employment Conditions Commission about the remuneration and benefits received by employees in each occupational category and level. If this statement reflects disproportionate income differentials, the employer must take steps progressively to reduce such differentials.

Enforcement 
The EEA provides for four ways in which compliance with its affirmative-action provisions may be ensured:

 self-regulation;
 administrative procedures;
 court action; and
 state contracts.

Self-regulation 
Employment equity plans must include dispute-resolution procedures. Employers and employees must use these procedures first.

Administrative procedures 
A labour inspector, with reasonable grounds for believing that an employer is not complying with the EEA, may try to obtain a written undertaking from the employer that he will comply. If he refuses, the inspector may issue a compliance order, to which the employer may object within 21 days.

Court action 
The Labour Court has the power

 to make a compliance order an order of court;
 to direct the Commission for Conciliation, Mediation and Arbitration to conduct an investigation to assist the court;
 to order compliance with any provision of the EEA;
 to hear appeals against compliance orders imposed by the Director-General; and
 to impose fines on employers if they fail to comply with the EEA.

State contracts 
Designated employers who wish to enter into commercial contracts with organs of state must comply with the EEA. They must attach to their offer either

 a certificate of compliance issued by the Minister of Labour; or
 a statement that they do comply.

If these requirements are not met, the organ of state may reject the offer; it may even constitute grounds for the cancellation of a contract that has already been concluded.

Job security

Common law 

The common law afforded the employee virtually no protection against unfair dismissal. Before the Labour Relations Act (LRA), as long as the employer gave the required period of notice, dismissal or probation was acceptable. The common law focused only on the lawfulness of the employment contract itself; the reason for the dismissal was irrelevant. The employer was not required to give the employee an explanation for the termination; nor was there any requirement that the dismissal be fair.

This had the effect of increasing the bargaining power of the employer, who could, essentially, do as he pleased, because of his more powerful position. The employer could threaten to dismiss the employee if the latter refused to accept less favourable terms and conditions of employment. The reason for this, it has been contended, is that, prior to 1980, this area of law was based on the incorrect assumption that there existed equal bargaining power between employer and employee.

International Labour Organization 

South Africa has since subscribed to international labour standards, in the form of International Labour Organization (ILO) instruments like the Termination of Employment Convention, 1982, which provides that an employer must have a fair reason to terminate the employment contract, and that the reason for dismissal must fall into one of three broad categories:

 the misconduct of the employee;
 the employee's incapacity or inability to do the work; and
 the employer's operational requirements.

Misconduct relates to the behaviour of the worker, usually involving some fault on his part, like insubordination, assault, theft, dishonesty, frequent late-coming or intimidation of co-workers.

Capacity relates to the worker's ability to do his job. It includes incompetence or incapability for medical reasons (ill health or injury). It is viewed as a no-fault dismissal.

Operational requirements relate not to the employee, but rather to the business enterprise of the employer. If an employee is dismissed on this ground, his is a no-fault dismissal. The most common form that this category takes is dismissal based on the economic needs of the business, or on the employer's need to restructure the organisation.

The Convention states further that employers must notify employees or their representatives that dismissal is contemplated, and must provide relevant information to them. The employer is obliged to consult regarding measures to minimise the number of dismissals, and also to mitigate the adverse effects of dismissal.

Labour Relations Act 

Unfair dismissal is now governed by the Labour Relations Act. Some have argued that the Labour Relations Act undermines the flexibility required for the free market to exist. Others have argued that a restrictive labour law promotes job security, loyalty and incorporation into companies.

The Labour Relations Act gives regulates and gives effect to the following, which includes but is not limited to: to give effect to section 27 of the Constitution; to regulate the organisational rights of trade unions; to promote and facilitate collective bargaining at the workplace and at sectoral level; to regulate the right to strike and the recourse to lockout in conformity with the Constitution; to promote employee participation in decision-making through the establishment of workplace forums; to provide simple procedures for the resolution of labour disputes through statutory conciliation, mediation and arbitration. Furthemore, provides for the right not to be unfairly dismissed or subjected to unfair labour practices.

Unfair dismissal 

Not only employees have the right not to be unfairly dismissed; non-employees enjoy such protection. The Labour Relations Act's approach to unfair dismissal may be summarised in the following three questions:

 Is the worker an employee? (Only employees may be dismissed, and only employees enjoy the protection of the Labour Relations Act.)
 Has there been a dismissal? (To answer this question, one must look to section 186(1) of the Labour Relations Act.)
 Is the dismissal substantively or procedurally unfair? (In this regard, the reason for the dismissal will be a decisive factor.)

The employee has the onus to establish that there has in fact been a dismissal. If this is discharged, the onus shifts to the employer, who prove the fairness of the dismissal.

"Dismissal" is the termination of the employment relationship by the employer, with or without notice. It can also entail

 that the employee reasonably expected the employer to renew a fixed-term contract of employment on the same or similar terms, but the employer offered to renew it on less favourable terms, or did not renew it at all; or
 that the employer refused to allow the employee to resume work after she took maternity leave in terms of any law or collective agreement, or in terms of her contract of employment.

An employer who has dismissed a number of employees for the same or similar reasons, but who now offers to re-employ one or more of them, while refusing to re-employ another, will have dismissed the latter.

The statutory definition also recognises as constituting dismissal certain circumstances in which the employee terminates the employment relationship. This is known as constructive dismissal.

Where, for example, an employee terminates a contract of employment, with or without notice, because the employer has made continued employment intolerable for him, he will have been constructively dismissed.

An employee may also be regarded as having been constructively dismissed if he terminates a contract of employment, with or without notice, because his new employer, after a transfer of the business as a going concern, provided him with conditions or circumstances at work which are substantially less favourable than those provided by his former employer.

Termination of the employment contract 

Section 186(1)(a) of the Labour Relations Act refers to the standard form of dismissal. Either the employee is given notice of the termination, or his contract of employment is terminated by way of summary termination. Note, again, that only "employees" may be dismissed.

The requisite period of notice may be expressly stated in the contract itself, in terms of a statute such as the Basic Conditions of Employment Act, or even in terms of a collective agreement. In terms of the Basic Conditions of Employment Act,

 one week's notice is required in the first six months of employment;
 two weeks' notice if the employee has been employed for more than six months but less than a year; and
 four weeks' notice if he has been employed for more than a year.

Summary termination by the employer may be justified if the employee has committed a serious or fundamental breach of a material term of the contract.

It is worth noting, that it a common misconception that an employee can be terminated by simply giving notice in terms of his/her employment contract. All terminations must be in accordance with the Code of Good Practice: Dismissal.

In CSIR v Fijen, an employee and his employer had quarreled during negotiations, with the employee declaring their relationship "finished," and the employer interpreting this as a resignation. The employee subsequently denied having resigned; what he meant, he argued, was that the working relationship had become intolerable. The court held that, in the absence of a clear and unambiguous intention to quit, there could not have been a proper resignation. The employer, therefore, was mistaken in its interpretation of his words.

There were indications, in Ouwehand v Hout Bay Fishing, that the employee would be retrenched. Representations were made to him that he should find other work. He stopped going to work, therefore, on the assumption that he had been dismissed. The court, however, held that he had resigned, because the onus is on the employee to show that he has been dismissed. The employee in this case did not discharge that onus.

When dismissal may be effected is a question of some practical importance. It relates to the question regarding the commencement of employment: Does it commence when the contract is concluded, or rather when the employee starts working? The difficulty is that there may be a significant lapse of time between these two events.

The Labour Court held, in Whitehead v Woolworths, that, to qualify as an employee, it was insufficient for the employee to prove that a contract of employment had been concluded. The conclusion of the contract merely gives rise to contractual claims; it does not confer the status of an employee or employer on the parties for the purposes of the Labour Relations Act. "In terms of the definition," Waglay AJ found,

a person is only an employee when such person actually works for another person. The employee must therefore have rendered a service to another which services are not that [sic] of an independent contractor. In addition to working for another the employee must also "receive" or be "entitled to receive" remuneration. The remuneration referred to must correspondingly mean remuneration for work done or tendered to be done.

Two subsequent decisions of the Labour Court, in Jack v Director-General, Department of Environmental Affairs and Wyeth SA v Manqele, have taken a different approach.

The rights and remedies of a job applicant were considered in Jack, where the employer breached the contract by not allowing the party to commence work on the agreed date. The Labour Court, having examined the question of whether or not there was an employment relationship between the parties, decided that, once the parties have reached agreement on all the essential terms of the contract, it will be binding and enforceable.

In Wyeth, employer and employee had concluded a written contract on 15 March providing that the employee would commence work on 1 April. Before work commenced, the employer informed the employee that it was no longer prepared to employ him. The Labour Court held that the term "employee" in the Labour Relations Act encompasses a person who has concluded a contract to work, and that such person would also enjoy protection against unfair dismissal. This is in line with a purposive interpretation of the definition of "employee."

The employment relationship is wider than the employment contract. While the contract of employment is the foundation of the relationship, the relationship may begin before the employee commences working, and may endure for some time after the contract has been terminated. It ought also to be noted that, although abscondment by the employee constitutes a breach of contract, this by itself does not necessarily bring the contract to an end. Only when the employer accepts the employee's repudiation of the contract may it be said that there has been a dismissal.

In some cases, an employment relationship is terminated by neither the employer nor the employee, but by operation of law. This occurs, for example, when an employee's residence or work permit expires, and is sometimes called "automatic dismissal."

Failure to renew fixed-term contract 

The employee must have a "reasonable" expectation that the fixed-term contract will be renewed. He bears the onus of proving that the expectation of continued or permanent employment is reasonable. The test is objective, inquiring into whether or not a reasonable person would anticipate renewal in such circumstances.

In addition, the employer must have created the impression that such an expectation was justified. The following are among the ways in which the employer or his representative may create such an impression:

 by past renewals of fixed term contracts;
 by making representations to the employee that the contract will be renewed; and
 by assuring the employee that the contract will be renewed.

There must, then, be some form of "prior promise or past practice." An offer on less favourable terms is also subject to the reasonable-expectation test.

In SA Rugby v CCMA, the coach of the team indicated to certain players that he had "plans for them." When it came to choosing the side, however, certain of those players were not even sent to training, and therefore were ineligible for the renewal of their contracts. It was held that the coach's representations to the players were such that they had a reasonable expectation of renewal.

What about the reasonable expectation of a permanent position? In Dierks v Unisa, the employee had been employed by means of a series of fixed-term contracts. He argued that he had been unfairly retrenched, and that he was entitled to a permanent position. It is important to draw a distinction between the employee's two expectations:

 that the fixed-term contract would be renewed on the same or similar terms; and
 that he would have permanent employment.

The court held that section 186(1)(b) relates to the first expectation only, but the Labour Court later found, in McInnes v Technikon Natal, that its decision in Dierks had been incorrect. It took the view that the focus should be on the nature of the expectation, and whether or not in the circumstances the expectation was reasonable. In casu, the employee genuinely believed that she would be doing the same work as before, the only difference being that her appointment would in future be permanent. In this case, the "similar terms" referred to included the reasonable expectation of permanent employment on similar terms.

The uncertainty continued with Auf Der Heyde v University of Cape Town, where the Labour Court accepted that the approach in Dierks was correct, and that section 186(1)(b) did not include a reasonable expectation of permanent employment. This case, however, went on appeal, where the judge found it unnecessary in the circumstances to decide the issue.

Dismissal for reasons relating to pregnancy 

The Basic Conditions of Employment Act provides for four months' maternity leave, but does not require that it be paid. It is possible, however, for an employee to make a claim in terms of the Unemployment Insurance (UIF) Act. Individual or collective agreements may provide for paid maternity leave.

An important concession in the Basic Conditions of Employment Act is that no employee may be expected to work for the first six weeks after the birth of her baby, but a midwife or medical practitioner may certify that she is fit to work if the employee wishes to do so. An employer's refusal to allow an employee to return to work after she has been on maternity leave (paid or unpaid) will now fall within the ambit of "dismissal" for the purposes of the Labour Relations Act. If an employee does not return to work within the period permitted, this will probably be viewed as abscondment, in which case the normal sanctions will apply.

Selective re-employment 

In a sense, in cases of selective re-employment, the employment relationship continues even after the employment contract itself has been terminated. Three elements are essential:

 There must have been a dismissal.
 The employees concerned must have been dismissed for the same or similar reasons.
 The employer must subsequently have offered to re-employ one or more of the previously dismissed employees, while refusing to re-employ one or more of the others.

Constructive dismissal 

The essential feature of a constructive dismissal is that the employee terminates the employment contract. His resignation is not entirely voluntary, however, as it is brought about or necessitated by the actions or omissions of the employer. These actions must be "intolerable." The employee, in resigning, indicates that he would have carried on work indefinitely had not the intolerable situation been created.

In considering whether or not there has in fact been a constructive dismissal, the courts will ask the following questions:

 Did the employee intend to bring an end to the employment relationship? Here one must look to the factual context. If the employee signs a resignation letter, such intention is almost certainly present. If the employee would have resigned anyway, even without the intolerable circumstances, he may not claim that those circumstances were the decisive factor. The time frame, too, is important: If the employee only resigns some months after an isolated incident, his case is less credible than if he had done so immediately. He is not automatically discredited, however; the situation must be viewed as a whole. Any subsequent conduct, where the accumulative effect is intolerable, must also be considered.
 Was the working relationship so objectively intolerable that it was no longer possible for the employee to work there? This must be viewed in light of the objective reasonable-person test. "Intolerable" conduct is conduct beyond the norm. To curse and swear in a particular environment may be completely acceptable, for example, and therefore not in itself intolerable. Misrepresentations made by an employer are considered intolerable, as is withholding an employee's salary or claiming deductions without prior written consent; so, too, is the making of threats, and abuse or violent behaviour, on the part of the employer. Furthermore, if an employee is denied the use of a company car, when such is required for the job, and the contract provides for one, this will also count as intolerable. On the other hand, a mere request by the employer to keep costs low is not intolerable; nor is the absence of immediate employment opportunities, or displeasure the employer's management style.
 Did the employer create the intolerable situation? The intolerable situation must be linked to the conduct of the employer.
 Is the situation likely to endure for a longer period of time? This depends on the circumstances of the case.
 Was termination the only option available to the employee? It must be the only reasonable option, and the employee must first have tried other possible dispute-resolution options: lodging a grievance, for example, and then giving the employer the chance to respond.

Transfer of employment contracts 

This is a relatively new form of statutory dismissal, added in terms of the 2002 amendment to the LRA. If a business is transferred, the employees must be transferred with it, and employed on the same or similar terms and conditions. Failure on the part of the new employer to do so constitutes dismissal.

Automatically unfair dismissal 
This area of the law is highly problematic. The LRA states that certain dismissals are automatically unfair; there is no argument as to their fairness. The compensation payable to an employee who has been dismissed for reasons that constitute automatic unfairness is up to 24 months' salary, depending on the circumstances. For a normal, merely unfair dismissal, the compensation is up to twelve months' salary.

Section 187 of the LRA 
Section 187 of the LRA lists the reasons for which an employee may not be dismissed under any circumstances. Such dismissals are "automatically unfair." Once it is proved that the employee has been dismissed for any of these reasons, the employer may not raise any defence save those provided for in the Act. Victims of automatically unfair dismissals will invariably be reinstated unless they choose compensation instead.

Section 187(1)(d) is of particular importance. It designates as automatically unfair dismissals in response to the employee's taking action, or indicating an intention to take any action, against the employer by exercising any right conferred by the LRA, or by participating in any proceedings in terms of the LRA. Dismissal for any conduct regarding membership of a trade union, or for exercising the rights conferred by the labour legislation, is automatically unfair.

The rights referred to are found in section 5 of the LRA. They include lawful trade-union participation, non-compliance with an unlawful order and disclosure of information.

In CEPPWAWU & another v Glass & Aluminium, hostility from the employer in the workplace led to a constructive dismissal. The hostility was very closely related to the employee's work as shop steward. The court held that the employer had made the employee's life unbearable due to the fact that he was a shop steward; the dismissal was therefore automatically unfair. The court noted that victims of automatically unfair dismissal will invariably be reinstated unless they choose compensation instead.

What constitutes an automatically unfair dismissal? 
This is a factual dispute. Whether the facts give rise to an automatically unfair dismissal, or merely an unfair dismissal, depends on the circumstances of each case.

Dismissals contrary to Section 5 
Section 5 confers on employees a right to freedom of association and the right to belong to workplace forums. No employee may be dismissed for exercising these freedoms in any way: for example,

 by participating in the formation of a union;
 by joining a union;
 by participating in a union's lawful activities or in the election of its officials; or
 by standing for election for such a position.

Section 5 further prohibits prejudicing employees for failing or refusing to do anything that an employer may not lawfully require of him.

No dismissal is permitted for the disclosure of information which the employee is lawfully entitled or required to communicate to other persons, or for exercising any right or participating in any proceedings in terms of the LRA. The mere fact that employees are exercising a right under the LRA does not mean, however, that they are immunised against disciplinary action for misconduct committed outside the scope of their duties.

Strike dismissals 
The LRA distinguishes between protected and unprotected strikes. The dismissal of an employee for participating in a protected strike is automatically unfair. Participants in protected strikes, however, may be dismissed for misconduct (assault, for example, or intimidation) during the course of the strike.

In cases where it is difficult to distinguish between a dismissal for striking and a dismissal for (by way of example) misconduct, the "true" and "proximate" cause of the dismissal must be identified.

Section 65(5) provides that participation in a strike which does not comply with the provisions of the LRA is misconduct. It "may constitute a fair reason for dismissal," but there are specific procedures to follow.

Dismissal to compel employee to accept demand in mutual-interest dispute 
In terms of section 187(1)(c), employers may not threaten employees with disciplinary action if they do not comply with a demand: a salary decrease, for example. The Labour Court has considered situations in which employees are threatened with dismissal for refusing to accept unilateral amendments of their terms and conditions of employment by their employers. In this regard,

 the first issue is whether or not an employer has a right to dismiss employees who are not prepared to agree to changes to their terms and conditions of employment; and, if so,
 the second issue is the nature of the relationship between that right and the employees' right not to be dismissed for the purpose of being compelled to agree to a demand in respect of a matter of mutual interest.

Employers may lock out employees (provided that they follow the proper procedure) as a bargaining strategy. A lock-out does not constitute dismissal, as the employees are still employed by the employer.

The difficulty is that an employer may argue that he has the right to dismiss, for operational reasons, those employees who do not accept such a demand. It can be factually difficult in such cases to determine what was the true reason for the dismissal.

Section 187(1)(c) does not prevent employers from dismissing employees who refuse to accept a demand if the effect of that dismissal is to save other workers from retrenchment. Nor does this form of automatically unfair dismissal preclude an employer from dismissing a grossly insubordinate employee.

In Afrox Limited v SACWU & Others, the company had a distribution system that resulted in its drivers working in excess of the overtime permitted by law. It decided to introduce a system of staggered shifts to overcome the problem. The employees, refusing to work under the new system, went on strike. They were subsequently dismissed for "operational reasons", as the deliveries from the branch that had been striking were outsourced. The employees contended that the real reason why they were fired was because they were on strike. The court held that, although the strike accelerated the dismissal, the workers did not comply with the Basic Conditions of Employment Act when they went on strike; therefore, regardless of the strike, the dismissal on operational reasons was upheld as fair.

In Fry's Metal v NUMSA, the court held that the dismissal of employees who refuse to accept a demand does not infringe section 187(c) if the employer intends to get rid of the workers permanently. In this case, the dismissal was not in an attempt to force compliance; it had gone so far as to constitute operational reasons.

In CWIU v Algorax (Pty) Ltd, Algorax had not formally declared a lock-out. The court held, therefore, that the employer had infringed section 187(1)(c), because it offered to reinstate the employees after dismissing them. Had Algorax formally declared the lock-out, it would seem that it could have kept the employees out for as long as it did without having to compensate them for unfair dismissal.

Insubordination 
In retrenchment cases, it is difficult to decide when an employer is entitled to dismiss for insubordination when employees refuse to comply with instructions. One must distinguish between refusal to work and refusal to do work in the specific way required by the employer. A computer technician refusing to fix computers is refusing to work, but an employee refusing to use a particular computer programme is refusing to do work in a specific way.

If the employees are contractually obliged to perform the work demanded of them, and the employer's instructions are reasonable, the employees' refusal amounts to insubordination. It is not unfair to dismiss employees for refusing to comply with their employers' instructions to perform the work required by their contracts.

What if the employee refuses to carry out an order not in accordance with the contract, but with how the employer runs his business?  This will depend on the facts: If the instructions are reasonable, such refusal could amount to insubordination.

In Kroukam v SA Airlink, Kroukam was an airline pilot who doubled as a shop steward. He was dismissed after deposing to an affidavit for the purposes of an urgent application by his union to have the company's senior manager committed for contempt of court. He was charged with a number of offences, including gross insubordination. The company claimed that he had divulged the content of an off-the-record discussion in his affidavit, and also that he had refused to submit to a health test required of pilots. The Labour Court ruled that this was not an automatically unfair dismissal. On appeal, however, the court held unanimously that the main or dominant reason for Kroukam's dismissal was his involvement in litigation against the company. The court held, accordingly, that such a dismissal was indeed automatically unfair.

Pregnancy dismissals 
Section 187(1)(e) is one of a number of statutory provisions aimed at protecting women in employment. Prior to these types of provisions, a woman who left work to have a baby was largely at the mercy of her employer. Under the common law, her absence could be treated as a reason for termination of the contract.

Now, according to the EEA and the LRA, dismissal is unlawful if it is for any reason regarding pregnancy or discrimination on the ground of pregnancy. The employee has no duty to inform her employer that she is pregnant; the employer has no right to ask and demand an answer. Accordingly, a woman may not now be dismissed in any circumstances merely because she is pregnant.

Section 187(1)(e) also renders impermissible the dismissal of a woman on maternity leave (now up to four months under the new Basic Conditions of Employment Act).

Nothing precludes an employer from dismissing a pregnant employee for operational requirements, provided that the court can be persuaded that there was indeed a valid economic or related reason.

In Whitehead v Woolworths, the court held that an employer may have regard to economic considerations, including the woman's availability to perform her services, when considering whether to employ a pregnant applicant.

Section 187(1)(e) embraces any reason "related to her pregnancy." It therefore includes reasonable absences for medical attention and changes in the woman's physical configuration, which may dispose certain employers to fire employees engaged in certain types of work.

If the main reason for the dismissal is the employee's pregnancy, the employer may not rely on an ancillary reason like the employee's alleged deceit in not disclosing her condition. Conversely, a pregnant woman may not rely on her pregnancy as a defence against conduct that constitutes a disciplinary offence.

Mashava, in Mashava v Cuzen & Woods Attorneys, was admitted as a candidate attorney at the firm. At the time of her employment, she was pregnant. She did not disclose this. The firm accordingly dismissed her, but the court held that this was automatically unfair. The employer could not rely on her deceit regarding her condition as a reason for dismissal.

Fair dismissal 
Fair dismissals are composed of two golden threads: substantive fairness and procedural fairness. Both must be present in order for the dismissal to be fair and in accordance with the labour legislation. Employees may be dismissed fairly only for misconduct, incapacity and operational reasons. Each of these has its own procedure, which must be followed.

Any person considering whether or not the reason for dismissal is fair, or whether or not the dismissal was effected in accordance with a fair procedure, must take into account any relevant code of good practice issued in terms of the Act.

Discipline and dismissal for misconduct 
Dismissal is the most severe penalty that an employer may impose against an employee guilty of misconduct. In determining whether or not dismissal is appropriate in the circumstances of a case, the employer may have to weigh up a number of factors to come to a decision.

Origin of employer’s right to discipline 
Generally, the employer has the right to maintain and enforce discipline in the workplace. This right has its origin in common law as an implied term in the contract of employment. It is also inextricably linked to the employee's duty to obey all lawful and reasonable instructions, and is linked to the employer's right to give instructions. Today the employer's right to discipline is regulated to a certain degree by the LRA and the Code of Good Practice: Dismissal, annexed to the LRA as Schedule 8 (the Code).

Discipline and common law 
Under the common law, the employer may summarily dismiss the employee if the latter's misconduct is serious, or dismiss the employee merely by giving the required notice. Occasionally, the employer may prefer to impose a less severe penalty, but the employer's action in imposing a penalty may not amount to a breach of contract. Suspension without pay or demotion, or ordering forfeiture of an agreed bonus or part of the wages, would constitute a breach of contract. The employer may, however, suspend the employee on full pay and give warnings.

The effectiveness of these penalties was questionable. Suspension on full pay, for example, was found to have little deterrent effect. In practice, the employer's superior bargaining power, and his right to dismiss merely by giving notice, meant that the employer could "convince" the employee to agree to a penalty which would otherwise have amounted to a breach of contract.

The Code and employer’s right to discipline 
The Code of Good Practice recognizes the employer's common-law right to discipline employees by requiring, in item 3(1), that "all employers should adopt disciplinary rules which establish the standard of conduct required of employees."

If an agreed disciplinary code exists in the workplace, item 1(2) of the Code stipulates that disciplinary action against employees must comply with the disciplinary code and procedure.

If, however, the disciplinary code was unilaterally introduced by the employer, or if no such code exists, regard must be had to the Code's provisions. The employer's own code must be measured against the provisions of the Code; in the absence of an employer code, the Code will constitute the minimum guidelines for discipline.

Form and content of disciplinary codes of conduct

Form 
The Code accepts that the form of the employer's disciplinary rules will vary according to the size and nature of the business, but these rules must be clear and made available to employees so that there is certainty as to what the employer expects from them and as to what sort of behavior will not be tolerated.

A disciplinary code may take the form of a collective agreement between the employer and a trade union or unions; it may be a policy unilaterally imposed by the employer; or it may be incorporated into the terms and conditions of employment.

Very often a recognition agreement, in terms of which the employer recognizes one or more trade unions as the collective bargaining agent of a certain category of employees, will include, as an annexure, an agreed disciplinary code and procedure. In this way, a disciplinary code and procedure obtains the status of a collective agreement.

Content 
The Code accepts that the content of a disciplinary code will vary according to the size and nature of the employer's business. Some rules of conduct may be so well established and well known that it is unnecessary for the employer to communicate them to the employees. An employee who breaches such a rule cannot argue that the rule does not appear in the written disciplinary code. A rule will be so well established that it need not be communicated if the employees know that a particular act or omission will not be tolerated if the employer has always in the past disciplined employees who committed the particular act or omission.

Rules may also be considered to be well established by virtue of common-law contract principles, like a breach of the duty to act in good faith. Examples of acts and omissions that are held to constitute such a breach include

 theft;
 assaulting the employer, a superior or co-employees;
 insubordination;
 failure to obey a reasonable and lawful order;
 drunkenness, if it affects the employee's work or is persistent or results in prejudice;
 absence without leave or repeated absence;
 misappropriation of company property;
 timekeeping or clock-card offences; and
 unfair competition with the employer.

Employer disciplinary codes usually contain the disciplinary sanctions for each type of disciplinary infraction and the procedure to be followed.

In some cases, the industrial court has drawn a distinction between theft and petty pilfering, and has required that, to justify dismissal, the offence at issue should disclose a "thieving propensity" on the part of the employee. In Anglo American Farms Boschendal Restaurant v Komjwayo, however, this distinction was rejected. The court held that the true test was whether or not the employee's action had the effect of rendering the relationship of employer and employee intolerable. Although it has been somewhat more lenient in some cases, the CCMA has generally followed a strict approach in cases of theft and other forms of dishonesty.

Due to South Africa's apartheid past, racist abuse is viewed in a particularly serious light. In Lebowa Platinum Mines v Hill, an employee was dismissed for calling another employee a "bobbejaan" (baboon). The court held the dismissal to be justified because the court found that the term had a racist connotation.

Corrective or progressive discipline 
In terms of the common law, the employer may either condone the misconduct or elect to act against the employee. If the misconduct is of a sufficiently serious nature, the employer may decide to cancel the contract of employment and dismiss the employee.

Dismissal is only one of a number of penalties that the employer may impose against the guilty employee.  Examples of other penalties are

 suspension without pay;
 verbal and written warnings;
 demotion; and
 transfer.

The Code emphasizes the concept of corrective or progressive discipline. Item 3(2) requires that the employer try to correct employees’ behavior through a system of graduated disciplinary measures such as counselling and warnings. Formal disciplinary procedures do not have to be invoked every time  a rule is broken. Informal advice and correction is the best way to deal with minor violations of work discipline.

Warnings may be graded according to degrees of severity, as with a verbal warning for a first offence, then a first written warning, then a final written warning or suspension without pay or demotion, and finally dismissal, which is reserved for repeated offences or serious misconduct. Item 3(4) gives a list of examples of serious misconduct that may result in a disciplinary enquiry and possible dismissal for a first occurrence. The list includes

 gross dishonesty;
 wilful damage to company property;
 wilful endangering of the safety of others;
 physical assault on the employer, a fellow employee, client or customer; and
 gross insubordination.

Substantive fairness of dismissal for misconduct 
As stated before, section 188(1) of the LRA requires that, if misconduct is the reason for dismissal, it must be with fair reason. Item 7 of the Code provides some guidelines as to when misconduct will constitute a fair reason for dismissal. The following must be considered:

 whether or not the employee contravened a rule or standard regulating conduct in, or of relevance to, the work-place; and,
 if a rule or standard was contravened, whether or not
 the rule was a valid or reasonable rule or standard;
 the employee was aware, or could reasonably be expected to have been aware, of the rule or standard;
 the rule or standard has been consistently applied by the employer; and
 dismissal was an appropriate sanction for the contravention of the rule or standard.

The guidelines in item 7 for a substantively fair dismissal are not hard and fast rules. The employer's non-compliance with a particular guideline will not necessarily make the dismissal unfair. The question of whether or not non-compliance with a particular guideline is permissible depends on the circumstances.

Contravention of rule by employee 
There are two issues to be considered under this heading. In the first instance, it must be determined whether or not the rule existed; in the second, if the rule existed, it must be determined whether or not the employee contravened it.

Did the rule exist? 
The formulation of disciplinary rules is the responsibility of the employer. The most important source of these rules is a written disciplinary code or rules of conduct. If such a written code or set of rules exists, it must be examined to determine whether the rule which the employee is accused of having contravened is contained in that code. If the disciplinary code does not contain the rule under consideration, this may be an important indicator that such a rule does not exist in the particular workplace.

If the particular rule which the employee is accused of having contravened is not included in the written code, this does not necessarily mean that the employee's dismissal is unfair.

The particular rule may be contained in

 the employee's written contract of employment;
 a policy or personnel manual; or
 notices placed on the notice boards in the workplace

Legislation such as the Occupational Health and Safety Act may also regulate the conduct of employees. Sections 14 and 15 impose a number of duties on employees, such as

 the duty to take reasonable care for the health and safety of themselves and of other persons who may be affected by their acts and omissions;
 the duty to carry out any lawful order and obey the health and safety rules and procedures laid down by the employer;
 the duty to report that an unsafe or unhealthy situation exists; and
 the duty to report that they have been involved in any incident which may affect their health or which has caused an injury to them.

Another important source for rules is the common law, which includes, for example, the duty to act in good faith.

Item 7(a) of the Code provides that one may also consider whether the employee contravened a rule regulating conduct "in, or of relevance to the workplace." The provision is broad enough to entitle the employer to proceed against the employee who has contravened a rule after working hours, or even outside the premises of the employer. The circumstances that this is possible are limited, however, to those situations where the misconduct in some way affects or is otherwise relevant to the employer's business.

Was there a contravention of the rule? 
Once it has been established that the rule exists, the next issue to be addressed is whether or not the employee has contravened it. This is an issue which must be determined on the facts. If, for example, the employee is charged with unauthorised possession of company property, this must be proven in the circumstances.

Section 192(2) of the LRA states that it is the employer who must prove that the dismissal was fair; therefore the employer must prove that the employee has contravened the rule. Neither the LRA nor the Code stipulates the standard by which the employer must prove the employee's contravention of the rule, but it is submitted that the employer must prove the contravention on a balance of probabilities.

The LRA and the Code also do not stipulate on what facts the employer may rely to prove the contravention. The Industrial Court has given conflicting opinions on whether the employer is restricted to relying on those facts which are available at the time of the enquiry, or whether he may also rely on facts which came to light after the dismissal. It is submitted that the Commission for Conciliation, Mediation and Arbitration will probably adopt the second approach.

Validity and Reasonableness of the Rule 
Once it is clear that the rule existed and the employee actually contravened it, attention must be focused on the rule itself.  The first aspect which must be determined is whether the rule is valid or reasonable. This is a factual question. Generally a rule will be valid or reasonable if it is lawful and can be justified with reference to the needs and circumstances of the business. Factors which may determine whether or not a rule is justified include the following:

 the nature of the employer's business (for example, a brewery prohibiting the use of alcohol by employers); and
 the circumstances in which the business operates (for example, the type of work which an employee does).

An important indicator of the validity or reasonableness of a rule is its inclusion in a disciplinary code that is contained in a collective agreement between the employer and a trade union. Unlike the rule the employer unilaterally enforces, this rule is the product of collective bargaining.

The reasonableness of a rule may be affected by the employer's preparedness in the past to enforce it. If it has not been enforced in the past, it may be an indication that the employer does not regard the rule as reasonable. The employer's failure to enforce a rule does not make that rule permanently invalid, however. It may regain its validity if the employer clearly and unequivocally informs the employees that the rule will be enforced in the future.

The fundamental issue is that the employer cannot act against the employee if the latter is unaware that the employer now regards a breach of the rule as serious.

Employee’s knowledge of rule 
The employee must have known, or could reasonably be expected to have been aware, of the rule. The rationale for this is that the employee should only be penalised for actions or omissions which the employee knew (at the time) were unacceptable. It is implied that the employee must also have known that a transgression of this rule may lead to dismissal.

Knowledge of the rule may be achieved through

 its inclusion in a written disciplinary code;
 meetings with workers;
 written briefs;
 notices on notice boars; or
 induction programs for new employees.

Certain forms of misconduct may be so well known in the workplace that notification is unnecessary. This would be the case with theft assault, intimidation, insolence and insubordination.

Consistent application of rule 
An employer must, as far as possible, treat employees in the same way if they have committed the same or similar offences. The employer must be consistent, in other words, in meting out discipline.

Two types of inconsistency may be distinguished:

 historical inconsistency, where the employer has in the past not proceeded against an employee for contravening the rule; and
 contemporaneous inconsistency, where employees who breach the same rule contemporaneously, or at roughly the same time, are not all disciplined, or not all in the same way, or to the same extent.

Inconsistency will not always be unfair. The employer can justify inconsistency through factors such as the employees’ different circumstances: length of service, for example, or disciplinary records and personal circumstances.

In SA Commercial Catering & Allied Workers Union v Bonus Building, the court held that, if a distinction is drawn between different employees, this distinction must be properly motivated; otherwise it will give rise to a perception of bias.

The court in City of Cape Town v Mashitho & Others found that, if an employer intends to discipline employees for misconduct which he has not disciplined them for in the past, the proper course is to make it known that such discipline will now be effected and the reasons for this change.

Dismissal as Appropriate Sanction 
Whether or not dismissal will be an appropriate sanction is a factual question. Item 3(5)-(6) of the Code lists factors to be taken into consideration. The employer should consider, in addition to the gravity of the misconduct, such factors as the employee's circumstances (including length of service, previous disciplinary record and personal circumstances), the nature of the job and the circumstances of the infringement itself. The employer should apply the penalty of dismissal consistently with the way in which it has been applied to the same and other employees in the past, and consistently as between two or more employees who participate in the misconduct under consideration. All these factors must be considered and weighed up together to decide whether dismissal is justified or whether a less severe sanction would be more appropriate.

It has been submitted that, even if the commissioner does not consider dismissal to be the appropriate sanction after considering all these factors, the penalty of dismissal will stand if the commissioner or judge is satisfied that a reasonable employer could also have decided to dismiss under the circumstances.

In the case of Sidumo and Another v Rustenburg Platinum Mines Ltd and Others [2007] 12 BLLR 1097 (CC), however, a security guard at a mine was not abiding by the search procedures he was obliged to employ for the workers at the mine. There was video footage available as proof that he was not adequately searching the workers. The security guard was dismissed on the suspicion that he could be fraternising with the workers in order to steal from the mines. The CCMA having held that this sanction was too harsh, the case was appealed to the Labour Court and then to Labour Appeal Court. When the case reached the SCA, the court held that employers have a discretion to dismiss. If the employer acts reasonably, his decision must be upheld.

On appeal to the Constitutional Court, it was held that the commissioner who hears the appeal must decide afresh if the decision was fair or unfair; therefore, it is not appropriate to look to the reasonable employer. The SCA approach, therefore, was found to be wrong. The test is what the reasonable commissioner would have done in those circumstances. The court, then, is not bound by the choice made by the reasonable employer. The "reasonable employer" test is no longer used.

Gravity of misconduct 
The more serious the misconduct, the greater the likelihood that dismissal is the appropriate penalty. The seriousness of the misconduct depends on a number of considerations:

 the nature of the offence;
 the circumstances surrounding the commission of the offence;
 the nature of the work performed by the employee;
 the nature and size of the employer's workforce;
 the position the employer occupies in the marketplace and its profile in the market;
 the nature of the work and services rendered by the employee;
 the relationship between the employee and the victim; and
 the effect of the misconduct on the workforce as a whole.

Circumstances of infringement 
A serious offence does not automatically warrant the employee's dismissal. It is not a "knee-jerk response" to all serious offences. There may be circumstances which have a tempering effect, not on the seriousness of the offence as such, but on the severity of the penalty: for example,

 in the case of theft, if the object which has been stolen is of such trifling value that dismissal may be too harsh a penalty;
 in the case of assault, if the employee was provoked or acted in self-defense; and,
 in the case of refusing to obey a superior's orders, if the instructions were unreasonable or illegal.

The Nature of the Employee’s Job 
In the case of a brewery, the employer will be justified in taking a strict disciplinary approach regarding intoxication and the use of alcohol during working hours. A less strict approach to intoxication may be expected from an employer whose employees do not deal directly with the public or who do not work with dangerous machinery. This, however, does not mean that such an employer may never dismiss employees for intoxication; it only means that a greater measure of progressive discipline will be expected from such an employer.

Employee’s circumstances 
These include the employee's length of service, status within the undertaking, previous disciplinary record and personal circumstances.

Years of service generally count in the employees favor. It must be noted, however, that the employer often puts a great deal of trust in an employee with long service; therefore, it could count against the employee if he breaches this trust after many years of service.

The employer will also expect a higher degree of responsible behavior from a supervisor or manager than from an ordinary worker.

If there is a previous warning on the employee's personnel file, stating that he will be dismissed if the same offence is committed in future, dismissal may be fair if this occurs. A warning does not remain valid indefinitely. The employer and trade union may agree on the period for which a warning will remain valid, or the employer's code may stipulate this. In the absence of such agreement or stipulation, the default position is that the warning remains valid for six months, unless the infraction is particularly serious, in which case it may remain valid for the duration of the employee's service.

Other personal circumstances which may be important include the employee's age, marital status and number of dependents.

Other employees dismissed for same offence 
The employer must, as far as possible, treat employees the same if they have breached the same rule or rules which are similar: There must be consistency when meting out discipline.

Procedural fairness of dismissal for misconduct 
Section 188(1)(b) of the LRA requires that a dismissal for misconduct must be effected in accordance with a fair procedure, which entails a fair disciplinary enquiry. The LRA does not regulate a fair disciplinary enquiry. The employer's disciplinary code and procedure usually prescribes the procedure to be followed and the manner in which the hearing should be conducted. The Code provides a number of guidelines for a fair enquiry in item 4: This is not a substitute for a disciplinary procedure but merely a template by which the fairness of a dismissal must be judged.

Normally, the employer should conduct an investigation to determine whether there are grounds for dismissal. This does not need to be a formal enquiry. The employer should notify the employee of the allegations, using a form and language that the employee can reasonably understand. The employee should be allowed the opportunity to state a case in response to the allegations. The employee should also be entitled to a reasonable amount of time to prepare the response, and to the assistance of a trade union representative or fellow employee. After the enquiry, the employer should communicate the decision taken, and preferably furnish the employee with written notification of that decision.

Discipline against a trade union representative, or against an employee who is an office-bearer or official of a trade union, should not be instituted without first informing and consulting the trade union. If the employee is dismissed, the employee should be given the reason for dismissal and reminded of any rights to refer the matter to a council with jurisdiction or to the commission, or to any dispute resolution procedures established in terms of a collective agreement.

In exceptional circumstances, if the employer cannot reasonably be expected to comply with these guidelines, the employer may dispense with pre-dismissal procedures.

Elements of procedural fairness

Investigation 
The purpose of the investigation is to determine whether or not there are grounds for dismissal. The investigation need not be a formal enquiry.

Notice of charge and investigation 
The employer must notify the employee of the allegations against him. The employer must use a form and language that the employee can reasonably understand. Usually the charge will be in writing and in the language which is commonly used in the workplace. Notice of the charge and of the disciplinary enquiry is usually given simultaneously and in the same document

Reasonable time to prepare response 
The question of what is a "reasonable time" is a factual one. The nature and complexity of the charges will certainly be relevant in ascertaining whether the employee has had sufficient time. Whether the employee had assistance in preparing a response will also be relevant.

Employee entitled to state case in response 
This is the core of procedural fairness in the context of dismissal for misconduct. The employee may dispute the facts on which the charges are based, or may plead guilty to the charges but argue that dismissal is not the appropriate sanction.

Employee entitled to assistance 
The employee is entitled to the assistance of a trade union representative or a fellow employee during the enquiry. "Trade union representative" is defined in section 213 of the LRA as a member of a trade union who is elected to represent employees in a workplace (commonly called a shop steward). "Fellow employee" includes a colleague, supervisor or even a director of the company for which the employee is working, provided that the director is also an employee.

The purpose of assistance is

 to assist with the presentation of the response to the charge; and
 to ensure that the procedure which is followed during the enquiry is fair.

Item 4(1) does not provide for assistance by a legal practitioner, such as an advocate or attorney, but some disciplinary codes provide for legal representation under certain circumstances.

Decision 
The decision as to whether or not an employee is guilty of the alleged misconduct, and as to the sanction, is usually the responsibility of the chairperson of the disciplinary enquiry. Some disciplinary codes, however, provide that the chairperson may only may a recommendation to senior management. The latter must then take the final decision, which could differ from the chairperson's recommendation.

An important question arises: Can senior management overturn the decision of a chairperson or order a second enquiry into whether or not the latter is empowered by the code not merely to make a recommendation but actually to decide the issue?

The court has indicated that this would be possible, subject to certain limitations, and that whether or not a second disciplinary enquiry may be opened depends on whether or not it would be fair to do so in the circumstances.

The court has also stipulated two cautionary remarks:

 The second enquiry must be permitted in terms of the employer's disciplinary code.
 It would probably not be considered fair to hold more than one enquiry, save in "exceptional circumstances."

The important yardstick is that of fairness.

Communicating decision 
Item 4(1) of the Code requires that the employer communicate the decision taken, preferably in writing. Both the verdict and the penalty must be communicated.

Employee to be informed of reason for dismissal 
Item 4(3) of the Code requires that, if the penalty is dismissal, the employee must be given the reason for it, and must be reminded of any rights to refer the matter to a bargaining council with jurisdiction, or to the CCMA or any dispute resolution procedure established in terms of a collective agreement.

Appeal 
Item 4 of the Code does not make a provision for an appeal to a higher level of management against the outcome of a disciplinary enquiry. If the employee is dissatisfied, he must implement the dispute-settling procedures provided by the LRA. If, however, the disciplinary code in the workplace makes provision for such an appeal, the employee will be entitled to appeal in accordance with the code.

Traditionally an appeal entails a re-hearing of the entire matter, including all the evidence presented, and a fresh consideration of the appropriate sanction.

Dispensing with pre-dismissal procedures 
Item 4(4) stipulates that the employer may dispense with a disciplinary enquiry in exceptional circumstances if the employer cannot reasonably be expected to comply with this requirement. Two broad categories of exceptional circumstances are

 crisis-zone situations (violent strikes in the mining industry, for example); and
 where the employee waives his or her right to a hearing (provided that the employee has full knowledge of his legal right thereto).

Waiver of the right may also be assumed if

 the employee's conduct is of such a nature that the employer cannot be expected to hold an enquiry;
 the employee refuses to attend the enquiry; or
 the employee fails to attend the enquiry because of a decision on the employee's part not to attend. Non-attendance due to illness does not constitute a waiver of this right.

Dismissal for incapacity 
Incapacity is one of the internationally recognized grounds for a fair dismissal, provided that a fair reason exists for the dismissal and that a fair procedure has been followed.

Section 188 of the LRA refers only to "incapacity." It does not distinguish between poor work performance and ill health or injury. This distinction is, however, drawn in the Code of Good Practice: Dismissal (the Code). Different sets of guidelines are provided for each: Item 11 deals with ill health or injury; item 9 deals with poor work performance. According to the former Prime Minister, "It will probably take a long time for the mods to find this."

While culpability or fault on the part of the employee is the essence of dismissal for misconduct, a dismissal for incapacity is a no-fault dismissal. Incapacity means that, unrelated to any intentional or negligent conduct or performance by the employee, the employee is not able to meet the standard of performance required by the employer. The employee is not capable of doing the work.

This ground of dismissal ties in with the common law duty of the employee to perform competently and without negligence. The difference between incapacity and misconduct in this regard is that

 misconduct occurs where the employee breaches this duty intentionally or negligently; whereas
 incapacity occurs where there is no intention or negligence on the part of the employee, but rather a supervening impossibility of performance.

Poor work performance 
A dismissal for poor work performance implies that there must be an objective standard of performance against which the employee can be measured, before the employee may be dismissed for failing to meet that standard. It is generally accepted that the setting of performance standards is within the employer's prerogative.

There are various ways in which an employer may establish performance standards and appraise an employee's ability to do the job to the satisfaction of the employer. At the outset of the relationship the employer may decide to put the employee on a period of probation. The Code distinguishes between employees who are dismissed during the probationary period and those who are dismissed after probation.

Item 9 of the Code provides, as guidelines in cases of dismissal arising from poor work performance, that any person, in determining whether or not a dismissal for poor work performance is unfair, should consider

 whether or not the employee failed to meet a performance standard; and,
 if the employee did not meet a required performance standard, whether or not
 the employee was aware, or could reasonably be expected to have been aware, of the required performance standard;
 the employee was given a fair opportunity to meet the required performance standard; and
 dismissal was an appropriate sanction for the contravention of the rule or standard.

Employees on probation 
Item 8(1) of the Code sets out the basic principles in respect of probationary employees:

 An employer may require a newly hired employee to serve a period of probation before the appointment of the employee is confirmed.
 The purpose of probation is to give the employer an opportunity to evaluate the employee's performance before confirming the appointment.
 Probation should not be used for purposes not contemplated by this Code to deprive employees of the status of permanent employment. The practice of dismissing employees who complete their probation periods, and replacing them with newly hired employees, is not consistent with the purpose of probation and constitutes an unfair labour practice.
 The period of probation should be determined in advance. It should be of reasonable duration.  The length of the probationary period should be determined with reference to the nature of the job and the time it takes to determine the employee's suitability for continued employment.
 During the probationary period, the employee's performance should be assessed. An employer should give an employee reasonable evaluation, instruction, training, guidance or counselling in order to allow the employee to render a satisfactory service.
 If the employer determines that the employee's performance is below standard, the employer should advise the employee of any aspects in which the employer considers the employee to be failing to meet the required performance standards. If the employer believes that the employee is incompetent, the employer should advise the employee of the respects in which the employee is not competent. The employer may either extend the probationary period or dismiss the employee after complying with subitems (g) or (h), as the case may be.
 The period of probation may only be extended for a reason that relates to the purpose of probation. The period of extension should not be disproportionate to the legitimate purpose that the employer seeks to achieve.
 An employer may only decide to dismiss an employee or extend the probationary period after the employer has invited the employee to make representations and has considered any representations so made. A trade union representative or fellow employee may make the representations on behalf of the employee.
 If the employer decides to dismiss the employee, or to extend the probationary period, the employer should advise the employee of his or her rights to refer the matter to a council having jurisdiction, or to the commission.
 Any person making a decision about the fairness of a dismissal of an employee for poor work performance during, or on expiry of the probationary period, ought to accept reasons for dismissal that may be less compelling than would be the case in dismissals effected after the completion of the probationary period.

Different jobs may take different lengths of time to determine suitability. The requirement in terms of the length of probation is that of reasonableness. It is a common misconception in practice, that all employees must work a 3-month probation period, which is not the case.

If the probationary employee is not performing adequately, the evaluation, instruction, training, guidance or counselling referred to in the Code should focus on making it possible for the probationary employee to perform to the satisfaction of the employer. If the performance is not up to standard, the probationary employee should be given an opportunity to improve to the requisite standard.

In sub items (f) to (i) the word "should" is used, so the duty on the employer is less onerous than if the employee had already been confirmed in a permanent position. Item 8(1)(g)-(h) makes it clear that there is a difference between a dismissal during probation and after probation.

The amended Item 8(1) emphasizes that an employee is protected against an unfair dismissal even while serving a probation. The justification for these amendments is to make the dismissal of probationary employees easier in order to encourage job creation and to relieve employers of the onerous procedures they had to comply with before this item was amended.

Poor-work-performance dismissals after probation 
After the probationary period has expired, most employees will have tenure or permanent status. The procedures that an employer must follow to justify a dismissal for poor work performance after probation are to be found in Item 8(2)-(4), which provides that, after probation, an employee should not be dismissed for unsatisfactory performance unless the employer has

 given the employee appropriate evaluation, instruction, training, guidance or counselling; and,
 after a reasonable period of time for improvement, the employee continues to perform unsatisfactorily.

The procedure leading to dismissal should include an investigation to establish the reasons for the unsatisfactory performance. The employer should consider other ways, short of dismissal, to remedy the matter.

In the process, the employee should have the right to be heard and to be assisted by a trade union representative or a fellow employee.

Incapacity dismissals are made difficult, then, by the fact that there is considerable overlap between substantive and procedural fairness. They are not always clearly distinguishable.

Setting standards and assessment 
An employer is entitled to set the standards that it requires the employee to meet. The employer has the prerogative to decide whether or not those standards have been met.

In A-B v SA Brewaries, an employee engaged as a planning and administrative manager was charged with poor work performance on six occasions and demoted to the position of project controller. The arbitrator held that an employer is entitled to set the standards that it requires the employee to meet. Generally speaking, the court should not intervene unless the standards so set are "grossly unreasonable."

The commissioner held that the employee had been given a fair opportunity to meet the standards set by the employer and that the demotion was not procedurally unfair. The employer's performance appraisal and review process had identified the problem areas. The employee had been given an opportunity to improve before the demotion.

The commissioner stressed that, in most cases, senior managers have a duty to appraise their own performance and to rectify poor performance themselves.

Senior managers 
The status of the employee may play a role in the performance standards that the employee is expected to reach, and the extent to which the employee will be given an opportunity to improve his performance. The size of the organisation will also be a factor to consider when deciding the degree of the employer's responsibility towards employees whose performance is sub-standard.

Senior managers may indeed have a duty to assess their own performance standards. The courts have long accepted that senior employees are not always entitled to an opportunity to improve. They have been held to have the ability and duty to monitor their own work performance.

Failure to meet the standards required by regulatory body 
A dismissal for incapacity may be justified if the employee does not have the requisite qualifications or has not been accredited by a professional or statutory body.

Assessment and evaluation by employer 
The courts have stressed the need for a proper evaluation and assessment of an employee before any action is taken. There must be careful assessment and consultation, and an opportunity to improve.

The Commission for Constellation, Meditation and Aggregation has accepted that less strict standards should be applied to small businesses tasked with evaluating an employee for poor work performance.

Consultation process 
It is emphasised that it is through fair process that fair decisions are generally reached. If the dismissal was procedurally unfair, the courts have often been reluctant to reinstate the employee, choosing rather to award the employee compensation.

Dismissal as last resort 
No employee may be dismissed for poor work performance without first being made aware of the standards required and then being given an opportunity to improve. The employer is expected to make a reasonable accommodation for an employee and offer the employee alternative employment in some circumstances.

Incompatibility 
There was great debate regarding whether or not an employee's incompatibility (his inability to work harmoniously with other employees or to fit in with the corporate culture of the undertaking or organisation) constituted incapacity or a ground for an operational-requirements dismissal.

Considering the way the LRA is now structured, this distinction has become vital. Different pre-dismissal procedures must be followed by the employer; disputes about an allegedly unfair dismissal would follow different procedures.

Commission for Conciliation, Mediation and Arbitration commissioners now generally take the view that incompatibility constitutes incapacity and not operational requirements, but the debate continues.

There must still be a fair reason and fair procedure for such a dismissal. The employer is obliged to assist an employee who is causing disruptions in workplace relationship before dismissing him. If the employee is a genuine "misfit," appropriate warnings and counselling would be required.

It may happen that a call is made for the dismissal of an employee by a third party or co-workers. If this happens, the demand made must be "good and sufficient," and must be backed by a real and serious threat: for example, that the employees making the demand will go on strike if the employee in question is not dismissed. The employer must investigate alternatives and consult the employee in question.

The requirement that there must be no possible alternative is particularly true when racial or ethnic tension is the cause of the incompatibility. The test in such cases is that of necessity.

Ill health or injury 
The second type of incapacity dealt with in the Code is ill health or injury. It is addressed in Item 10 and Item 11.

The assessments referred to in Item 11 must be done in order to determine whether a dismissal would be appropriate in the circumstances. Item 11 of the Code provides that any person determining whether a dismissal arising from ill health or injury is unfair should consider

 whether or not the employee is capable of performing the work; and,
 if the employee is incapable
 the extent to which the employee is able to perform the work;
 the extent to which the employee's work circumstances might be adapted to accommodate disability, or, where this is not possible, the extent to which the employee's duties might be adapted; and
 the availability of any suitable alternative work.

Once again the dismissal must be both substantively and procedurally fair.

Substantive and procedural fairness 
Various aspects of substantive and procedural fairness are illustrated in Item 10.

Incapacity on the grounds of ill health or injury may be temporary or permanent. If an employee is temporarily unable to work in these circumstances, the employer should investigate the extent of the incapacity or injury. If the employee is likely to be absent for a time that is unreasonably long in the circumstances, the employer should investigate all the possible alternatives short of dismissal.

When alternatives are considered, relevant factors might include

 the nature of the job;
 the period of absence;
 the seriousness of the illness or injury; and
 the possibility of securing a temporary replacement for the ill or injured employee.

In cases of permanent incapacity, the employer should ascertain the possibility of securing alternative employment or adapting the duties or work circumstances of the employee to accommodate the employee's disability.

In the process of the investigation referred to above, the employee should be allowed the opportunity to state a case in response, and to be assisted by a trade union representative or fellow employee.

The degree of incapacity is relevant to the fairness of any dismissal. The cause of the incapacity may also be relevant. In the case of certain kinds of incapacity, like alcoholism or drug abuse, counselling and rehabilitation may be appropriate steps for the employer to consider.

Particular consideration should be given to employees who are injured at work or who are incapacitated by work-related illness. The courts have indicated that the duty on the employer to accommodate the incapacity of the employee is more onerous in these circumstances.

Item 10(1) highlights the nature, degree and extent of the incapacity, and the steps the employer should take to accommodate the employee. Whether the incapacity is temporary or permanent is also an important consideration.

Item 10(2) sets out the guidelines specifically for procedural fairness. There has been debate as to whether this process entails a formal hearing. As long as the employee is given a fair opportunity to indicate why he should not be dismissed, however, this feature has been complied with.

The degree of incapacity also plays a role (see Item 10(3)).

The employer's duty to accommodate is emphasized, with particular reference to employees incapacitated due to a work-related injury or illness (see Item 10(4)).

A related issue if that of habitual absenteeism, where an employee is often absent from work due to illness or injury. It appears that the approach of the court will vary according to the degree and nature of the absenteeism. Frequent and lengthy absences due to ill health may justify termination at a point where the employer can no longer be expected to tolerate such absences.

Disability 
In many cases, the terms "incapacity" and "disability" are used interchangeably. Incapacity may be due to an accident causing a loss of limb or the slow onset of an illness like cancer or HIV/AIDS, or a person may have been born with a physical or mental impairment that others perceive as a disability.

The real issue in equity or anti-discrimination legislation is to protect the rights of disabled people, particularly in the area of employment, as employers may perceive a ‘disabled person’ to be unsuitable for the workplace.

Although the Constitution and LRA both have general equity provisions for people with disabilities, there is no statutory definition in these Acts. The EEA, however, defines people with disabilities as people who have a long-term or recurring physical or mental impairment which substantially limits their prospects of entry into, or advancement in, employment.

The Americans with Disabilities Act of 1990 (arguably the most important international legislation in this field) defines a disabled person as "one who has a physical or mental impairment that substantially limits a major life activity, a person who has a past record of such an impairment, or a person who is regarded by other people as having such an impairment."

"Reasonable accommodation" means any modification or adjustment to a job or to the working environment that will enable a person from a designated group to have access to or participate or advance in employment.

A dismissal based on disability may thus be automatically unfair, giving the employer no defense and the judge no discretion—except that the dismissal may be fair if the reason is based on an inherent requirement of the job.

The employer will also bear the onus of proving that the dismissal for disability was based on the inherent requirements of the job and that the dismissal is both substantively and procedurally fair.

Dismissal for operational requirements

Context 
An employer may find itself facing financial ruin (due to unsound strategy, large clients or contracts having been lost, or factors in the economy at large). Under pressure, the employer may be forced into considering reducing its wage bill by restructuring the organisation, which may mean dismissing some employees. In this scenario, the word "retrenchment" is often used.

Section 188 of the LRA recognizes that an employer also has operational requirements and needs, and that, in certain cases, these may also be a fair and valid reason for dismissal.

According to section 213 of the LRA, "operational requirements" are requirements based on the economic, technological, structural or similar needs of an employer.

There are four categories of operational requirements. From these categories it is clear that the reason for the dismissal does not relate to the employee; it is due to the needs of the employer, and therefore reason for the dismissal is the employer's.

An employer's economic needs, for example, include those needs and requirements relating to the economic well-being of the enterprise. One of the most common economic reasons for dismissal is financial difficulties (due to, for example, a downturn in the economy or a decrease in the demand for certain products).

"Technological needs" refers to the introduction of new technology, such as more advanced machinery, mechanization or computerization, leading to the redundancy of employees.

Structural needs as a reason for dismissal describes posts becoming redundant following a restructuring of the enterprise. This often follows a merger or amalgamation.

Employer’s similar needs 
This is a very broad category and must be determined with reference to the circumstances of the case. There is no clear and absolute dividing line between an employer's "economic" needs and "similar" needs, as there are often considerable overlaps.

Changes to employee’s terms and conditions of employment 
A business may have to be restructured or amalgamated with another enterprise, or its mode of operation may have to be altered in order to ensure its survival or to make it more competitive.

These changes may lead to an employee's becoming redundant, but changes of this nature may also lead to the employee's being offered a new position, with changes to the terms and conditions of employment.

If the employee unreasonably refuses to accept the changes to the terms and conditions of employment, the employee may be dismissed for operational requirements.

In WL Ochse Webb & Pretorius v Vermeulen, the employee was a tomato salesman for WL Ochse (the employer) and was paid a basic salary and commission. He earned more than the other employees, as the sale of tomatoes attracted a higher commission than the sale of the vegetables sold by the other employees. This caused dissatisfaction among the other workers, which the employer tried to address by proposing a new remuneration system. The salesman was given three alternatives:

 He could accept the new system.
 He could present an alternative system.
 He could resign.

He proposed that the old system be retained. When this proposal was rejected by the employer, he resigned.

The court held that the employer had not acted unfairly, as a successful business requires contented employees. Unhappiness can lead to several problems, such as labour unrest and a drop in productivity. A commercial rationale for the changes was thus established by the employer.

Dismissal to compel an employee to accept changes to terms and conditions of employment is branded as automatically unfair by section 187(1)(c) of the LRA. The primary motive for dismissal must be a commercial rationale or operational reason in order for the dismissal to be fair.

The fundamental difference between an operational requirement dismissal and an automatically unfair dismissal is the employer's reason for the dismissal. If an employer dismisses employees because the terms and conditions of employment must be altered for the business to continue being viable, the employees may be fairly dismissed, as they no longer serve the employer's operational requirements.

In Fry's Metals v National Union of Metalworkers, the court discussed the difference between an operational-requirement dismissal and an automatically unfair dismissal:

 In the case of a dismissal due to operational requirements, the purpose is to get rid of employees who do not meet the business requirements of the employer, so that new employees who will meet the business requirements can be employed.
 In the case of an automatically unfair dismissal, the employer wants his existing employees to agree to a change of their terms and conditions of employment, and has the attitude that, if the employees do not agree to the changes, he will dismiss them.

A change in the terms and conditions of employment need not always be the result of changes regarding the business. The circumstances or attitude of the employee could change. This could have such serious economic repercussions for the employer that the latter deems it vital to change the employee's conditions of employment.

The nature of a business may be such that special demands are made on the employees. It may be essential for the economic success of the business, for example, that the employees are able and willing to work overtime. The employee's inability or refusal to do so could jeopardise the well-being of the business; therefore a dismissal would be fair.

Incompatibility and related reasons 
The courts have accepted than an employee whose actions negatively affect the operation of a business may be dismissed. This may occur where certain actions of the employee create disharmony among his co-workers, as when, for example, he antagonises co-workers by continually making racist or sexist remarks.

In Erasmus v BB Bread, employees called for the dismissal of a manager because of his problematic attitude towards them, and his having made derogatory remarks, particularly aimed at black employees. The Industrial Court (in terms of the old LRA) held that his dismissal was for a valid and fair reason, as the employer is entitled to insist on reasonably harmonious interpersonal relationships between employees. If sound relationships appear to be impossible, the employer may be entitled to remove the employee from the scene.

In East Rand Proprietary Mines v UPUSA, the issue was the fairness of the dismissal of a number of Zulu-speaking workers after violent clashes between them and workers belonging to other ethnic groups. Although the court found that the dismissal had been unfair in the circumstances, it did acknowledge that a dismissal which had its roots in an arbitrary ground, such as ethnic origin, could be fair if the employer could prove that dismissal was the only option left to ensure the safety of the targeted employees and the continued well-being of the business. The court held that an employer may dismiss employees because it cannot guarantee their safety in light of the ethnic hostilities, but the employer must be able to show that it truly had no other alternative.

Breakdown in the trust relationship 
The relationship between the employer and employee is one of trust. It entails the confidence that the employee is adhering to the common-law duty to act in good faith towards and in the best interests of the business.

If the facts show that this duty is breached, the employee is guilty of misconduct and, if sufficiently serious, may be dismissed.

If the employer is unable to prove such a breach on a balance of probabilities, the employee may not be dismissed for misconduct, but may be dismissed for operational reasons, as such mistrust is counter-productive to the operation of the business.

In Food & Allied Workers Union v Amalgamated Beverage Industries, the Industrial Court accepted that the dismissal of a number of employees on suspicion of assault had an operational rationale to it.

Substantive issues

Real reasons and increases in profits 
Before the introduction of section 189A of the LRA in 2002, there was no statutory definition of substantive fairness in the case of an operational-requirements dismissal. The question is a factual one; the employer must prove:

 that the proffered reason is based on the operational requirements of the business, so that the employer will have to prove that the reason for dismissal falls within the statutory definition of "operational requirements;" and
 that the operational reason actually existed, and was the real reason for the dismissal. The reason may not be a mere cover-up for another reason.

A dismissal for operational reasons need not be restricted to the cutting of costs and expenditure. Profit, or an increase in profit, or gaining some advantage such as a more efficient enterprise, may also be acceptable reasons for dismissal.

If the employer can show that a good profit is to be made in accordance with a sound economic rationale, and it follows a fair process to retrench an employee, the dismissal is fair.

Large-scale Dismissals 
Section 189A of the LRA distinguishes between the size of employers and also the size of dismissals when regulating substantive and procedural fairness of dismissal.

Section 189A(1) distinguishes between a small employer (less than fifty employees) and a big employer (more than fifty employees).

In terms of s189A(1)(a) a large-scale dismissal would entail the employer's dismissing

 ten employees, if the employer employs between fifty and 200 employees;
 twenty employees, if the employer employs between 200 and 300 employees;
 thirty employees, if the employer employs between 300 and 400 employees;
 forty employees, if the employer employs between 400 and 500 employees; and
 fifty employees, if the employer employs more than 500.

In terms of s189A(1)(b), a dismissal by a big employer of fewer than the prescribed minimum listed above still constitutes a large-scale dismissal if the number of employees to be dismissed, together with the number of employees that have been dismissed for operational reasons in the twelve months previously, exceeds the number specified above.

This is a so-called "rolling twelve-month period" and must always be calculated backwards, starting from the date on which the employer gives notice in terms of section 189(3) of the latest proposed dismissal for operational reasons.

The purpose of the twelve-month rolling period is to ensure that employers do not manipulate the number of employees to be dismissed so that the dismissal always falls outside the ambit of section 189A.

Section 189A(19) of the LRA provides that, in any dispute referred to the Labour Court concerning the dismissal of the number of employees in terms of subsection (1), the court must find that the employee was dismissed for a fair reason if

 the dismissal was to give effect to requirements based on the employer's economic, technological, structural or similar needs;
 the dismissal was operationally justifiable on rational grounds;
 there was a proper consideration of alternatives; and
 selection criteria were fair and objective.

"Economic, technological, structural or similar needs" 
This requirement entails that the reason for dismissal must be for "operational requirements," as defined in section 213. It must also be the real reason for the dismissal.

"Operationally justifiable on rational grounds" 
"Rational" grounds are grounds that are founded upon "reason" or "logic." The rationality test is an objective one, measuring the acceptability of the reasons for dismissal against that which would generally be considered acceptable. It is not a subjective test focussed only on what the particular employer considered to be justifiable under the circumstances.

"Proper consideration of alternatives" 
One of the requirements for a procedurally fair dismissal is consultations on measures to avoid dismissals. This inclusion makes this procedural requirement also a requirement for substantive fairness, and goes further by requiring "proper" consideration.

"Proper" consideration entails more than merely considering alternatives. The employer must apply its mind and give defensible reasons for dismissing such alternatives, and show that dismissal was a last resort.

"Selection criteria were fair and objective" 
One of the requirements for a procedurally fair operational requirements dismissal is that the parties must attempt to reach consensus about the method to be used to select employees for dismissal. Where the parties are unable to agree, the criteria used must be "fair and objective." This procedural requirement is also, therefore, a requirement for substantive fairness.

Courts' changing views 
In the past, the courts took the view that the function of the court is not to second-guess the employer's decision. It is not up to the court to ask whether it was the "best" decision under those circumstances; it needed only to consider whether it was a rational, commercial or operational decision.

Now the courts take a closer view of the employer's business decisions.

In BMD Knitting Mills v SA Clothing & Textile Workers Union, the court departed from its deferential approach and focused on the fairness of the reason to both parties:

The starting point is whether there is a commercial rationale for the decision. But rather than take such justification at face value, a court is entitled to examine whether the particular decision has been taken in a manner which is also fair to the affected party, namely the employees to be retrenched. To this extent the court is entitled to enquire as whether a reasonable basis exists on which the decision, including the proposed manner, to dismiss for operational requirements is predicated. Viewed accordingly, the test becomes less deferential and the court is entitled to examine the content of the reasons given by the employer, albeit that the enquiry is not directed to whether the reason offered is the one which would have been chosen by the court. Fairness, not correctness is the mandated test.

In Chemical Workers Industrial Union v Algorax, the court considered itself to be entitled to scrutinize the employer's business reasoning and decision-making in considerable detail. The reasoning given is that the court should not hesitate to deal with an issue which requires no special expertise, skills or knowledge that it does not have, but simply requires common sense or logic.

The most important implication of this approach is that the employer will need to convince the court not only that it has considered alternatives, but that it has chosen the option that makes the best business sense.

Procedural aspects 
There is no clear dividing line between substantive and procedural fairness in dismissals for operational reasons; the issues overlap considerably.

Consultation process 
The consultation process is at the heart of procedural fairness in the case of dismissal for operational requirements.

Section 189(1) of the LRA provides that, when an employer contemplates dismissing one or more employees for reasons based on the employer's operational requirements, the employer must consult

 any person whom the employer is required to consult in terms of a collective agreement;
 if there is no such collective agreement,
 a workplace forum, if such exists; and
 any registered trade union whose members are likely to be affected;
 if there is no workplace forum, any registered trade union whose members are likely to be affected; or
 if there is no such trade union, the employees likely to be affected by the proposed dismissals or their representatives nominated for that purpose.

In United National Breweries v Khanyeza, the court held that, where a union is recognized as a consulting party in a collective agreement, it is entitled to consult on behalf of all employees, even those falling outside the bargaining unit for which the union is recognised.

Note that consultation must take place when the employer "contemplates dismissal"—when the possibility of dismissal is foreseen, but the final decision to dismiss has not been reached. At most, therefore, the employer must have an intention to retrench.

Item 3 of the Code further entrenches the idea that consultation must take place when dismissal is "contemplated."

This ensures that the employees are afforded the opportunity to influence the employer in its final decision to dismiss or not to dismiss.

Section 189 does not prescribe the period over which consultation should extend, but Item 5 of the Code states that the circumstances of each case are relevant to the determination of a reasonable period.

Item 6 further states that the more urgent the need of the employer to respond to the factors giving rise to contemplated dismissals, the shorter the consultation process will be.

Consultation entails that the parties must engage in a meaningful joint consensus-seeking process and attempt to reach consensus. This means that the parties must embark on a joint problem-solving exercise, striving for consensus.

For the process to be meaningful, the employer must consult in good faith and not simply "go through the motions." This means the employer cannot have made up his mind to dismiss prior to consultation, and must be prepared to keep an open mind with regard to the representations made.

The employees must engage properly, make representations and ensure that their representations are well founded and substantiated, and not merely prolong consultations.

Should the parties fail to reach consensus, the final decision remains that of the employer.

In NEHAWU v University of Pretoria, the Labour Appeal court held that, after restructuring had been exhaustively discussed by a steering committee, on which all stakeholders were represented, the university was not required to consult again on all those issues after formally giving notice in terms of section 189 of the LRA.

Consultation topics 
Section 189(2) of the LRA provides that the employer and the other consulting parties must engage in a meaningful joint process, attempting to reach consensus on

 appropriate measures
 to avoid the dismissals;
 to minimize the number of dismissals;
 to change the timing of the dismissals; and
 to mitigate the adverse effects of the dismissals;
 the method for selecting the employees to be dismissed; and
 the severance pay for dismissed employees.

Measures to avoid dismissals 
There must be proper consideration of alternatives. The employer must apply its mind to the proposals and, if applicable, give defendable reasons for dismissing these alternatives and coming to the conclusion that dismissal was the only solution.

Possible alternatives include the following:

 granting paid or unpaid leave;
 reducing or eliminating overtime or work on Sundays;
 transferring employees to other departments; and
 training or retraining employees to enable them to take up other positions in the organisation.

The parties may consider spreading the dismissals out over a period of time to allow a natural attrition of numbers through retirements or resignations.

Measures to minimize the number of dismissals 
Once dismissals have been agreed as the only solution, the number of dismissals must be kept to a minimum. This may mean

 transferring employees to other sections or departments;
 asking for volunteers by means of offering a voluntary severance package;
 allowing natural attrition of numbers; or
 training or retraining.

Measures to change the timing of the dismissals 
While the employer may prefer the dismissals to be immediate, the union may prefer them to be spread over a period of time, or that they take place at a later stage.

Measures to mitigate the adverse effects of the dismissals 
The employer may, for example, assist the employee in finding alternative work by giving the employee time without loss of pay to search for alternative work.

The employer may also make an office available in which to complete job applications and arrange interviews.

The employer may provide a reference for the employee.

In Sikhosana v Sasol Synthetic Fuels, the court noted that the LRA contemplates a hierarchy of consulting parties, each if applicable excluding its successors. The courts apply section 189(1) strictly. It was held that, although appropriate measures to mitigate the adverse effects of the dismissals should be taken, employers are not required actively to seek alternative work for retrenched employees.

The employer may also undertake to give priority to the dismissed employee should a vacancy arise.

Criteria for dismissal and severance pay 
Consensus must also be reached on the criteria used to select which employees will be dismissed and the amount of severance pay the employee is entitled to.

Written Disclosure of Information 
The employer must disclose all relevant information in writing. Verbal assurances, explanations and information by the employer will not suffice; the other party may demand that the employer put everything down in writing or provide documentation such as financial reports.

According to section 189(3) of the LRA, all "relevant information" must be disclosed. This may include, inter alia,

 the reasons for the proposed dismissals;
 alternatives considered and the reasons for rejection thereof;
 the number of employees likely to be affected;
 the proposed method for selecting which employees to dismiss;
 the time when the dismissals are likely to take effect;
 severance pay proposed;
 any assistance the employer proposes to offer;
 the possibility of the future re-employment of the employees who are dismissed;
 the number of employees employed by the employer; and
 the number of employees the employer has dismissed for operational requirements in the preceding twelve months.

Relevance is a question of fact and entails all information that will allow effective consultation.

The onus is on the employer to prove that any information that it has refused to disclose is not relevant for the purposes for which it is sought.

Privileged information, information that may cause harm if disclosed and private personal information relating to an employee is not required to be disclosed, even if it is relevant.

Representations and consideration of representations 
Section 189(5) of the LRA provides that the employer must allow the other party an opportunity to make representations on any matter on which the parties are consulting. Representations on issues regarding the reasons for dismissal, alternatives to dismissal, measures to minimise the number of dismissals, the timetable for dismissal, assistance offered, severance pay, etc., are therefore allowed.

Representations about the disclosure of information and about "any other matter relating to the proposed dismissals" are also allowed: for example, the socio-economic effect that a mass dismissal would have on the local community.

The employer must engage with those representations and consider and respond to them.

Selection criteria 
Employees must be selected for dismissal in terms of selection criteria that have either been agreed upon or that are fair and objective.

This means that the criterion should not be arbitrary; it must be relevant, in that it relates to the conduct of the employee, such as length of service, ability, capacity and the needs of the business.

The following criteria are commonly used:

 seniority;
 conduct;
 efficiency, ability, skills, capacity, experience, attitude to work and productivity;
 attendance;
 bumping;
 retirement; and
 volunteers.

Seniority 
This is the "last in, first out" or LIFO principle. Long-serving employees are retained at the expense of those with shorter service in similar or less-skilled categories of work. This method minimises the use of subjective judgment to decide who shall be retrenched. This is why it is favoured by most unions.

The Code also acknowledges LIFO as a fair and objective criterion, but provides that it should not operate so as to undermine an agreed affirmative-action programme.

Exceptions may also include the retention of employees based on criteria (like special skills) which are fundamental to the successful operation of the business.

Conduct 
This criterion will be fair and objective if it is based on objectively determined conduct, like attendance records and previous warnings, and if the employee was at all times made aware that the employer found such conduct unacceptable.

Efficiency, ability, skills, capacity, experience, attitude to work and productivity 
These criteria are generally favored by employers. They are regarded as objective, provided they do not depend solely upon the opinion of the person making the selection, but can be objectively tested.

Furthermore, they may only be used if the employee knew that the employer considered them important.

Attendance 
This criterion will only be allowed if it can be proved that the employee always knew that the employer regarded absences from work seriously.

Bumping 
If retrenchment is to affect only one department in an enterprise, the practice is sometimes to retrench on the LIDO basis and to drain off remaining employees in that department into other departments.

Retirement 
Employees who have reached the minimum retirement age may be identified as the first population for retrenchment. After these employees have been retrenched, LIFO is used. This criterion is often applied in jobs which require a level of fitness and strength.

Volunteers 
Parties may agree that the employer will first ask for volunteers before embarking on any selection process.

Severance Pay 
Section 41 of the Commission for Conciliation, Mediation and Arbitration creates a statutory duty for the employer to pay severance to workers who are dismissed for operational reasons.

Severance pay is an amount for each completed year of continuous service.

Section 84 of the Commission for Conciliation, Mediation and Arbitration suggests that, for the purposes of determining the length of the employee's employment, previous employment with the employer must be taken into account if the break between the periods is less than one year.

The duty to pay severance is not absolute. If an employee unreasonably refuses an alternative position, he loses the right to severance pay.

The question of whether or not the refusal is reasonable is one of fact. Item 11 of the Code states that reasonableness is determined by a consideration of the reasonableness of the offer of alternative employment and the reasonableness of the employee's refusal. Objective facts such as remuneration, status and job security are relevant.

If the offered position amounts to a demotion, the refusal will not be unreasonable.

Large-scale dismissal by big employer 
Section 189A introduces additional requirements for a procedurally fair dismissal in the case of a large-scale dismissal.

Firstly section 189A affords either party the right to ask the Commission for Conciliation, Mediation and Arbitration to appoint a facilitator to assist the parties during the consultations; secondly, section 189A introduces a moratorium of sixty days, during which the employer may not dismiss.

Facilitation option 
Only the Commission for Conciliation, Mediation and Arbitration may be approached to appoint a facilitator.

The employer must make this request when it gives notice in terms of section 189(3) to the employee party that it is contemplating a large-scale dismissal.

The employee party (the union, for example) representing the majority of the employees may also ask for a facilitator. The employee party must notify the Commission for Conciliation, Mediation and Arbitration within fifteen days of the employer's notice of contemplated dismissal.

If neither party asks for a facilitator within the above timeframes, they may agree to ask for one to be appointed during the consultation process.

If a facilitator is appointed, the facilitation must be conducted in terms of the regulations made by the Minister of Labour for the conduct of such facilitation.

These regulations relate to the time period and variation of such time periods for facilitation, the powers and duties of facilitators, the circumstances in which the Commission for Conciliation, Mediation and Arbitration may charge a fee for appointing the facilitator, and the amount of the fee.

An employer may not dismiss before sixty days have elapsed from the date on which notice in terms of s189A(3) is given.

Non-facilitation option 
If none of the parties request a facilitator, section 189A stipulates that a minimum period of thirty days, from when notice in terms of section 189A(3) was given, must have lapsed before a dispute may be referred to the CCMA or other council.

Resolution of disputes 
Disputes regarding the procedural and substantive fairness of dismissals by a small employer, and small-scale dismissal by a big employer, are referred to the Labour Court.

In large-scale dismissals, disputes about procedural fairness must be referred to the Labour Court within thirty days after notice of dismissal has been given to employees.

In large-scale dismissals, where there are disputes about substantive fairness, there are two choices:

 strike action, in which case 48 hours' notice must be given; and
 the Labour Court, to which the employee party may elect to refer the dispute.

In the case of dismissal for operational reasons of a single employee, the employee may refer a dispute about substantive or procedural fairness either to arbitration or to the Labour Court.

Dismissal of strikers 
In terms of section 67(5), employees engaged in a protected strike may be dismissed if

 they are guilty of misconduct during the strike; or
 operational requirements require such.

Closures, mergers and sales of businesses 
A unique problem in labour law is the fate of employees when a business is sold or closes. This problem has a close practical connection to dismissals for operational reasons, as many businesses are sold because they are unhealthy and require restructuring.

Common law 
In terms of the common law, the position of the employees was that no employee could be forced to continue his contract of employment with the new employer; conversely, the new employer had no obligation to continue to employ the employee.

Transfer of a business could therefore mean the termination of existing employment contracts.

LRA

Original s 197 
When the LRA came into operation, section 197 endeavored to address job security in cases of the transfer of a business in the normal run of things and as a result of insolvency. The section was much criticised for its creation of uncertainty and for failing to define certain concepts. The section did not expressly state that employees have the right to have their contracts of employment transferred; the courts had to read that into the section. It also did not address the exact rights of the employees in such a situation.

New s 197 
The rewritten section 197 attempts to address the situation in a more calculated and extensive way. The most important difference is that ordinary transfers are dealt with separately from insolvency transfers.

Section 197 applies only in cases of a transfer of a business.

Section 197(1) defines a "business" as the "whole or a part of a business, trade, undertaking or service."

"Transfer" is defined as a "transfer of a business [...] as a going concern."

The right of employees to have their contracts transferred is dependent, therefore, on the business's transfer meeting the exact wording of section 197.

"Transfer" 
The meaning of this word is wider than a mere "sale." In Schutte & Others v Powerplus Performance, the court held as follows:

A business or part of a business, may be transferred in circumstances other than a sale.  These may arise in the case of merger, takeover or as part of a broader process of restructuring within a company or group of companies. Transfer can take place by virtue of an exchange of assets or a donation [.... G]iven the range of circumstances under which a transfer can take place, the need for an agreed price or valuation may not arise. Consideration may take some other form. The outsourcing in this matter was part of a broader process of restructuring and must be seen against the backdrop of the [old employer's] acquisition of 50% stake in the [new employer].

"As a Going Concern" 
Once it is established that there was a transfer, the important question is whether that transfer was of the "whole or a part of any business, trade, undertaking or service [...] as a going concern."

A distinction is often made between three ways of transferring a business:

 a sale of shares;
 a sale of assets; and
 a sale of the business itself.

In respect of a sale of shares, it has been held that a distinction should be made between a transfer of a business as a going concern and a transfer of possession and control of a business: the result of a sale of shares. A sale of shares is excluded from the ambit of section 197.

In respect of a sale of assets, the court in Kgethe v LMK Manufacturing held that an agreement to sell a portion of the assets of a business is not a transfer as a going concern. Although this judgment was overturned on appeal, it was on the basis that the court was not entitled to make a finding as to the true of the agreement. Therefore, the previous decision is still tenuous authority for the proposition that a sale of assets does not constitute a transfer as a going concern.

In Schutte v Powerplus Performance, however, the court held that, irrespective of the form the agreement takes, the court will look to the substance of the agreement to determine whether or not it is transferred "as a going concern."

The following factors may be taken into account in finding that there has been a transfer of a business as contemplated in section 197. This list is not exhaustive:

 a pre-existing relationship between the buyer and seller;
 a previous in-principle agreement to sell a certain part of the business;
 the wording of the contract itself;
 the fact that the buyer employed the majority of the employees;
 use of the same premises by the buyer; and
 continuation of the same activities without interruption.

In National Education Health & Allied Workers Union v University of Cape Town, the court held as follows:

In deciding whether a business has been transferred as a going concern, regard must be had to the substance and not the form of the transaction. A number of factors will be relevant to [this question], such as the transfer or otherwise of assets both tangible and intangible, whether or not workers are taken over by the new employer, whether customers are transferred and whether or not the same business is being carried on by the new employer. What must be stressed is that this list [...] is not exhaustive and that none of them is decisive individually. They must all be considered in the overall assessment and therefore should not be considered in isolation.

Outsourcing 
The question of whether or not an outsourcing of services falls within the ambit of section 197 has been subject to some scrutiny.

In SAMWU v Rand Airport Management Company, the employer outsourced its gardening and security services to outside contractors, as this was cheaper. The court held that the gardening and security services fell within the ambit of the term "service" in section 197, and that these services could be transferred from one employer to another. The next question considered was whether these services were being transferred as a going concern. The court referred to the decision in NEHAWU v University of Cape Town, and affirmed that a flexible approach must be taken in finding an objective answer to this question. On the facts, the court held that the agreement between RAMC and the other employer in respect of the outsourced services amounted to a transfer of a service within the ambit of section 197. On the evidence, however, the court could not decide whether the agreement between the two companies had been implemented, and therefore could not decide whether the contracts had been transferred from RAMC to the service provider.

This decision confirms, however, that an outsourcing exercise may constitute a transfer of a going concern as envisaged in section 197. The Labour Appeal court did not specify, however, what factors are to be taken into account, so this does not provide a final answer to the question of whether or not all outsourcing arrangements will fall within section 197.

General rules 
Once it is established that s197 applies, one must consider the effect thereof. The four consequences of such a transfer are listed in section 197(2). These principles have far-reaching implications for the new employer, who may want to restructure the business and possibly retrench employees.

If the new employer decides to retrench employees, severance pay will be calculated on the basis of service with the old and new employer to determine the years of service.

Similarly, remuneration and benefits may be linked to years of service, which may also place a financial burden on the new employer.

Section 197 may also affect the freedom of the new employer to apply certain selection criteria in cases of retrenchment. In Keil v Foodgro (A Division of Leisurenet), Keil was first employed by MacRib and then by Foodgro, who bought MacRib as a going concern. Keil was employed in the same position by both employers. Foodgro sought to justify Keil's selection for retrenchment on the basis that it had applied LIFO, and that Keil's old contract was substituted with a new one when Foodgro bought the business. The court rejected this argument on the basis that section 197 provides for continuity of employment, so Foodgro should have taken Keil's service with MacRib into account. Foodgro's selection for dismissal was therefore fundamentally flawed. Keil was awarded nine months' compensation.

The new employer will also be expected to pay for the "sins" of the old employer. In NUMSA v Success Panelbeaters & Service Centre, an employee was unfairly dismissed by the old employer. The employee successfully challenged the fairness of the dismissal, the Labour Court ordering that the employee be reinstated. By this time, however, the old employer had sold the business as a going concern. The court held, accordingly, that the new employer was obliged to take the employee into service.

There are a number of additional principles relating to the consequences of a transfer.

Should the new employer not adhere to its obligations to provide transferred employees with at least substantially the same conditions or circumstances at work, and should this lead to termination of the contract by the employee, it will be considered an automatically unfair dismissal according to sections 186 to 187 of the LRA.

Exceptions 
The general rule that the employees of the old employer become the employers of the new employee, with the same terms and conditions of employment, and with continuity of employment, is subject to a number of exceptions.

Section 197(3) provides that the new employer may provide terms and conditions of employment that "are on the whole not less favorable."

Furthermore, the consequences of a transfer, as envisaged in section 197(2), are expressly subject to an agreement in terms of section 197(6). Although employees may insist on their contracts being transferred, the right to be afforded the same contractual rights must be agreed upon.

Regarding the identity if the parties, section 197(6)(a) states that the agreement must be with the same bodies or persons with whom an employer has to consult about retrenchments. As far as the employer is concerned, either the old or the new employer may be the other party to the agreement.

Any agreement which interferes with the employees' existing terms and conditions has to involve the employees in order to be valid.

In cases of retrenchment prior to transfer, the retrenchment will only be substantively fair if the retrenchment is based on the operational requirements of the old employer and not those of the new employer.

An employee of the old employer who refuses "adequate alternative" employment with the new employer when faced with retrenchment by the old employer is not entitled to severance pay.

Only those rights which actually did accrue contractually to employees prior to the transfer are transferred. Only the rights of the employees existing at the time of transfer become the obligations of the new employer.

Employees cannot use section 197 as a form of statutory bargaining to insist on better terms and conditions of employment.

Not all benefits (especially pension benefits) are provided by employers. Only existing rights may be transferred.

Section 197 of the LRA allows the transfer of employees from one pension fund to another as a result of a transfer of a business if the criteria in section 14 of the Pension Funds Act are met.

Insolvency 
The term "sequestration" refers to the insolvency of an individual. The terms "liquidation" and "winding-up" refer to the insolvency of a company, close corporation or other legal entity.

In the past, the approach has been that all contracts of employment between the insolvent employer and its employees terminate automatically. This meant that the employees lost their jobs. In respect of unpaid wages, they became creditors of the insolvent estate of the employer. It also meant that an employer could manipulate the process of insolvency by applying for a provisional liquidation to get rid of employees, and then come to some kind of arrangement with a prospective buyer, or with the creditors, to ensure the survival or continuation of the operations. The employer could thus ensure the automatic termination of the employment contracts without actually going out of business.

Section 197A of the LRA addresses this situation.

This section also only applies to a "transfer" of a "business." These terms have the same meaning as under section 197.

Section 197A applies only if the old employer is insolvent, or if a scheme of arrangement or compromise with creditors is entered into in order to avoid winding-up or sequestration.

As a general principle, the effect of section 197A is that all employees of the old employer become employees of the new employer; continuity of employment is preserved.

These consequences are also subject to agreement (between the employees and the new or old employer, or both) to the contrary.

Other similarities between ordinary transfers and transfers in case of insolvency are:

 The new employer complies with its obligations if it takes over the employees as long as the terms and conditions of employment are, on the whole, not less favourable.
 Subject to agreement, the new employer is bound by pre-existing arbitration awards and collective agreements.
 Provision is made for the transfer of employees from one pension fund to another as a consequence of the transfer of the business.
 Resignation of an employee, faced with substantially less favourable conditions and circumstances, will be regarded as automatically unfair.

In transfers in the normal course of business, however,

 the rights and obligations of the old employer and the employees at the time of the transfer remain; and
 the new employer does not inherit the "sins" of the old employer.

Subsections 197(7) to (9), regarding the valuation and provision of accrued benefits, do not apply to transfers in cases of insolvency.

Collective labour law 

The power play between employers and employees is clearly in evidence in the engagement of employer and employee through collective labour law. The LRA, together with other labour legislation, lays down basic rights and duties and remedies for ensuring fairness in the employment relationship. These are matters relating to the rights of employees and are accordingly known as "rights issues." When it comes to creating new terms and conditions of employment—these are known as "interest issues" or "matters of mutual interest"—or to changing existing terms, no legislation exists which explicitly regulates the situation. These issues, it is assumed, are better dealt with by the parties themselves. A court may not, for example, determine an annual increase for employees, or decide whether or not a crèche facility at the workplace is mandatory, or whether employees should be permitted to take Friday afternoons off. The reason for this is that "it is impossible to regulate these matters of mutual interest." This is where collective bargaining comes into the picture.

The LRA recognizes the importance of collective bargaining and supports the mechanism:

If collective bargaining can be compared to a boxing match, the LRA can be seen as the organiser of the boxing match and the employers and trade unions are the boxers on opposite sides. The LRA provides the basic rules to protect the boxers both inside and outside the boxing ring. This is done, for example, by protecting the right of employees to form and join trade unions and to participate in their activities. This applies equally to employers who can form employers' organisations.

Section 213 of the LRA defines a trade union as “an association of employees whose principal purpose is to regulate relations between employees and employers, including any employers’ organisation.” An employer organisation is defined as “any number of employers associated together for the purpose, whether by itself or with other purposes, of regulating relations between employers and employees or trade unions.”

The LRA regulates the registration of trade unions and employers' organisations. It creates bargaining fora, such as bargaining councils and statutory councils, and guarantees the right to freedom of association. It also regulates organisational rights and strikes and lock-outs.

Once workers are organised in a registered trade union, and employers in an employers' organisation, the power play between workers and employers begins. Employees may try to force the employer's hand by way of strike action, while the employer ma exert pressure on the employees by way of a lock-out. It is accepted that strike action will result in a certain measure of economic handship for the employer. Provided that the strike has obtained protected status in terms of the law—in other words, is not prohibited, and the prescribed procedures have been followed—such economic hardship is considered to be part and parcel of the power struggle between employees and their employers: "In fact, this is the whole idea!" The more the employer is hurt economically, the greater the chance that the strikers' demands will be met.

It is important to know when a strike or lock-out is protected, and when it is not, because that will determine the course of action and remedies for employers in the case of a strike, and for employees in the case of a lock-out.

History

Industrial Conciliation Act (1924) 
Between 1911 and 1918, a succession of laws was promulgated in South Africa which dealt with various industrial sectors, and with labour in general. Only in the aftermath of large-scale industrial unrest on the Witwatersrand in 1922, however, was any comprehensive attempt undertaken to regulate relations between management and organised labour. The tumult on the Rand led directly to the first comprehensive piece of labour legislation, the Industrial Conciliation Act 1924, which was also the first legislation to regulate strikes in the country. It also recognised and regulated lock-outs. The Act provided for the registration of white trade unions and employers’ organisations, "self-evidently also white," and established a framework for collective bargaining through industrial councils or conciliation boards, as well as a dispute settlement system. Although the Act was "largely voluntarist," compliance with its provisions and with collective agreements was enforced by criminal sanction. The 1924 Act resulted in greater wage disparity between different racial groups. The Industrial Conciliation Act dealt only with collective labour rights; individual rights were dealt with in a Wage Act in 1925.

Industrial Conciliation Act (1937) 
Problems of enforcement led to a major revision of South African labour law, with the introduction of the Industrial Conciliation Act 1937. The 1937 Act tried to introduce more councils, in a greater geographical spread, so that more collective engagements could be facilitated. There was a proliferation of unregistered trades union for black people, who were legislatively excluded. Specifically, pass-bearing black workers were excluded, although certain black women could unionise.

Botha Commission 
1948 was a watershed year. The Nationalist Party won the election, albeit by small margin (which grew in later years), on the promise of apartheid. The Botha Commission was established to determine how to regulate labour relations in such a way as to protect the interests of white people. The commission's comprehensive review led to legislation that had a far-reaching effect on the labour structure. Trade unions were racially divided, job reservation was introduced and blacks were precluded from joining registered trade unions. The commission recommended that black trade unions should be dealt with in separate legislation, but the government went a step further and created an entirely separate legislative framework for black workers in general. Trade unions in the 1950s among black workers were therefore not part of the formal collective bargaining framework.

By 1952, black women were also excluded from trade-union membership, while in 1953 the Black Labour Relations Regulation Act made provision for, inter alia, the creation of a Central Black Labour Council and regional committees, black labour officials and black workers’ committees. 1956 saw the prohibition of the creation of mixed-race trade unions, necessitating different unions for different race groups. This was part of the State's attempt to isolate and fragment the workforce. It fuelled unrest, however, rather than quelling it.

In the 1970s, the power of the black trade unions became especially notable, in a period marked by political unrest and industrial action. In 1973, provision was made for the creation of liaison and coordinating committees, and a restricted right to strike was accorded black workers. This attempt to accommodate black interests, without recognizing their parity with white interests, did not have the desired effect.

Wiehahn Commission 
This dualistic system of labour relations—one for blacks and the other for whites, "coloureds" and Indians (although the latter groups were also discriminated against)—lasted until the beginning of the 1980s. In 1977, the government appointed the Commission of Enquiry into Labour Legislation, commonly known as the Wiehahn Commission that made significant recommendations for change, which changed the face of collective bargaining in South Africa. It was tasked to examine the current legislation and make recommendations to maintain the peace in the labour system. The Commission produced a six-part report, the primary recommendations of which were:

 that full trade union rights be accorded black workers;
 that job reservation be scrapped;
 that a Manpower Commission be established; and
 that the Industrial Court replace the existing Industrial Tribunal and be given extended powers.

In an attempt to give effect to these recommendations, significant amendments were made to the Industrial Conciliation Act (renamed the Labour Relations Act 28 of 1956), which with further amendments formed the legislative structure for regulating collective labour relations for the next 15 years.

The country's labour laws were thus largely "deracialised." All African workers who were not migrant workers could now join trade unions. The National Manpower Commission, a statutory body comprising representatives from employers organisations, trades and the State, which would meet to discuss economic and industrial policy, was duly established.

In recognition of the fact dispute-resolution mechanisms, thitherto inadequate, needed to be bolstered, the Industrial Court (predecessor of the present-day Labour Court) was duly established, too. The Industrial Court was largely hands-off in respect of collective bargaining, in which it did not think it had any place involving itself here.

The last change to be implemented as a result of the commission's findings was the removal of race-based job reservation, which was seen as having contributed to the unrest. These changes led to a tremendous growth in the trade union movement, which proved instrumental, especially in the 1980s, in the struggle against apartheid.

Labour Relations Act (1995) 
The system in place up to the advent of democracy, "when South Africa was shaken to the roots by the transformation of the apartheid regime into a fully democratic constitutional order," was very fragmented. There were numerous definitional problems, too. Given the prominent role played by trade unions in bringing down apartheid, and given "the rapid and large-scale movement of former union leaders and cadres into party politics and government, it is hardly surprising that much attention was given to labour rights m the new dispensation."

The right to fair labour practices, the right to bargain collectively and the right to strike were entrenched with a number of other fundamental rights in a new interim Constitution that came into force in 1993. Those rights remained entrenched in the final Constitution, adopted by the new democratic parliament on 8 May 1996. At that point, although all parties agreed that these fundamental labour rights should be given constitutional status (although there was some dispute about the extent of an employer's right to lock out), there was room for disagreement on the scope and content of those rights. The final Constitution provided that "national legislation may be enacted to regulate collective bargaining."

"From this cue," writes John Grogan, "the government set about preparing legislation to give flesh to the bones of the constitutional guarantees." The first step was to appoint a commission, under the chairmanship of Professor Halton Cheadle, to produce a draft Labour Relations Amendment Bill. This was accomplished six months later. The draft formed the basis of the new Labour Relations Act 66 of 1995, which appeared in its current form after "intensive debate" in the National Economic Development & Labour Council (NEDLAC), a body consisting of representatives of government, organised labour, and employers, including the Manpower Commission and the National Economic Forum. They started thrashing out a new framework, to deal comprehensively with both individual and collective labour law. Given the adversarial nature of the relationship between organised labour and employers up to that point,

this was a revolutionary development. Under the watchful eye of government representatives, and with their participation, management and labour were entrusted with the task of developing the draft bill into a uniquely South African product that at once satisfied the aspirations of labour and the reservations of management, and yet conformed to the letter and spirit of the Constitution and the requirements of the International Labour Organization (ILO), of which South Africa was now a member.

This produced the current LRA, "yet another turning point." One of the hopes of the drafters was to change the adversarial stance which tended to be adopted by unions and management under the old dispensation to a more co-operative one. The LRA created new institutions for encouraging union-management cooperation, and revamped old ones, "in the hope this would help transform and mature attitudes and bargaining styles."

Sources

Common law 
The common law of South Africa, "an amalgam of principles drawn from Roman, Roman-Dutch, English and other jurisdictions, which were accepted and applied by the courts in colonial times and during the period that followed British rule after Union in 1910," plays virtually no role in collective labour law. Initially, in fact, employment law, or "the law of master and servant," was regarded as a branch of the law of lease. As such, the common law did not concern itself directly with collective bargaining; its focus instead was on the rights and duties of individual employees and employers, as reflected in the contract on which their relationship was based. The law did not recognize claims by employees which had not been conferred by agreement. Although the role of the common law is minimal, therefore, the common-law contractual relationship between employer and employee underpins collective labour law in general and collective bargaining in particular.

Constitution 
Legislation therefore is pivotal. The Constitution, however, is more pivotal still. Section 23 enshrines the right to "fair labour practices," while section 18 provides that "everyone has the right to freedom of association." The right to strike, furthermore, has been explicitly constitutionalized. The Constitution also provides not only for the right of every worker "to form and join a trade union," but also for the right of every trade union "to form and join a federation," like COSATU. Similar rights are granted to employers and employers’ associations as well. The right to collective bargaining is constitutionalized, with a mandate for national legislation to regulate it. More controversially, the Constitution also provides that   "national legislation may recognize union security arrangements contained in collective agreements."

Labour Relations Act 
Collective bargaining is one of the ways in which the LRA gives effect to section 23 of the Constitution. It is also an important part of freedom of association. Among the first of the LRA's aspirations, listed in the Preamble, is "to regulate the organisational rights of trade unions." A trade union without organisational rights is not much of a trade union. Organisational rights allow the trade union to access the workplace, etc.

The Preamble also describes as a purpose of the LRA the promotion of collective bargaining, and the regulation of the rights to strike and to lock out. It seeks also to advance "the democratization of the workplace" by involving employees in decision-making through workplace forums, although these have not proliferated.

The LRA defines as an "employee" any person (excluding an independent contractor) who

 works for another person or the State;
 is entitled to receive remuneration for such work; and
 assists in conduct of the business.

"Trade union" is defined in the LRA as an association strictly of employees, whose principal purpose is to regulate relations between employees and employers. The trade union must act in the interests of its members. Trade unions also support individual members with individual disputes. A trade union must have an address in South Africa, and its name must not be so similar to that of another union "that it is likely to mislead or cause confusion." Other requirements are set out in section 95.

Excluded from the application of the LRA are the members of

 the National Defense Force;
 the National Intelligence Agency; and
 the South African Secret Service.

Freedom of association 
Freedom of association, "one of the cornerstones of liberal democracy," is also one of the basic principles of labour law, reflected in several ILO Conventions, in the LRA and in the Constitution. Freedom of association "stems from a basic human need for society, community, and shared purpose in a freely chosen enterprise [...] protecting individuals from the vulnerability of isolation and ensuring the potential of effective participation in a society." In short, people have the right to associate with others in order to defend and protect their common interests. This constitutes "both an individual and a collective human right." In addressing the individual facet of freedom of association, the Supreme Court of Canada, in Lavigne v Ontario recognized that "the essence of freedom of association is the protection of the individual interests in self-actualization and fulfillment that can be realized only through combination with others."

"However," writes Mpfariseni Budeli,

freedom of association is important not only to facilitate effective participation in civil and political society. It is equally important in the field of social and economic activity and is particularly significant as a basis for securing trade union freedom from interference by the employer on the one hand and the government on the other.

Freedom of association in the workplace may be defined as "those legal and moral rights of workers to form unions, to join unions of their choice and to demand that their unions function independently." It also includes the right of workers to participate in these unions’ lawful activities. "Freedom of association must therefore be seen," according to Budeli, "as the foundation of the collective bargaining process," which contributes to ensuring fairness and equity in labour matters, and to facilitating orderly and stable industrial relations.

Freedom of association is the foundation of the collective-bargaining process. Before a group or collective may engage in collective bargaining, it is necessary that legal protection be extended to that group or collective. Legal measures are also necessary to protect the rights of people to belong to a group or collective. This is what freedom of association is all about: the legal protection of the freedom of persons to join a collective entity. The law, therefore, both permits people to join trade unions, and also protects their right to do so.

The ILO Committee of Experts has provided "what can be regarded as the correct approach concerning freedom of association and social policy." In the committee's view, freedom of association should be guaranteed in such a way as to allow trade unions to express their aspirations, and so as to provide an indispensable contribution to economic development and social progress.

The Constitution grants a general right to freedom of association to "everyone," as well as explicitly and specifically to trade unions. Section 23 of the Constitution protects the right of employees to form and join a trade union and to participate in the activities and programmes of that union. Freedom of association does not apply only to employees, however; the employer's freedom of association is protected, too: Section 23 also protects the right of employers to form and join employers’ organisations, and to participate in the activities and programmes of such organisations.

Both trade unions and employers' organisations have the right

 to determine their own administration programs and activities;
 "to organize; and
 "to form and join a federation."

Finally,

every trade union, employers’ organisation and employer has the right to engage in collective bargaining. National legislation may be enacted to regulate collective bargaining. To the extent that the legislation may limit a right in this chapter the limitation must comply with section 36(1).

While the Constitution lays emphasis on the importance of freedom of association, the LRA emphasizes, protects and gives concrete content to this foundational right. The LRA recognizes the right of trade unions to organize themselves. Membership of a trade union is subject to the constitution of the trade union. This means that a union may determine, in its constitution, what types of employees may become members of the union, and what types of employees are disqualified from membership. Unless an employee qualifies for membership in terms of the union's constitution, he is ineligible for membership. This principle has its limits. A trade union which attempts, through its constitution, to limit its members to persons of a certain race or sex could find such a provision ruled invalid; "it would certainly not be registered in terms of the LRA."

Section 4 does not only protect the right to join and form a union. It also grants members of a union the right to participate in the affairs of the union. As a member of a trade union, an employee has the following rights:

 to participate in the union's lawful activities;
 to participate in the election of any of the union's office-bearers, officials or trade-union representatives;
 to stand for election, and be eligible for appointment, as an office-bearer or official, and to hold office if elected or appointed; and
 to stand for election, and be eligible for appointment, as a trade-union representative, and to carry out, if so elected or appointed, the functions of a trade-union representative in terms of the LRA or any collective agreement.

Again, these rights are subject to the constitution of the union. If the constitution of a union requires that the nomination of a candidate as union office-bearer be signed by ten members in good standing, and also that the election be by means of a secret ballot at the union's annual conference, these provisions of the union constitution must be complied with.

The LRA specifically grants employees the right to freedom of association, and protects both employees and people seeking employment, should this right be infringed by the employer. Section 5 of the LRA prohibits a wide range of actions which infringe the right to freedom of association in section 4. In terms of section 5(1), "No person may discriminate against an employee for exercising any right conferred by this Act." Examples of such discrimination would include an employer's dismissal of an employee, or failure to give an employee a discretionary annual bonus, because the employee joined a trade union, and an employer's resort to harassment against an employee because that employee has been elected as a trade-union representative.

The general protection of section 5(1) is complemented by section 5(2), which prohibits certain specific types of conduct that would undermine freedom of association. In terms of section 5(2)(a), no person may require an employee

 not to be a member of a trade union;
 not to become a member; or
 to give up membership.

The LRA grants the right of freedom of association to employers as well.

Section 5(2)(b) provides that no person may prevent an employee (or a prospective employee) from exercising any right in terms of the LRA, or prevent an employee from participating in any LRA proceedings. For example, where an employer prevents an employee from standing for election as a trade-union representative, or where he threatens a union representative with dismissal because the representative is representing a union member at a disciplinary hearing, the employer would be acting unlawfully.

In terms of section 5(2)(c), employees or job seekers may not be prejudiced because of their trade-union membership, their joining a trade union, their participation in the lawful activities of a trade union, or their disclosure of information that they are entitled or required to disclose.

Section 5(3) prohibits an employer from attempting to persuade or tempt an employee into surrendering rights granted in terms of the LRA. The employer may not, for example, offer to promote the employee, or promise a wage increase, on the condition that the employee surrender rights accorded him by the LRA.

Section 5(4) provides that any contract of employment that limits freedom of association, either directly or indirectly, is regarded as invalid—irrespective of whether or not the contract was concluded before the LRA came into effect.

In terms of section 187 of the LRA, it will be an automatically unfair dismissal if the employer, in dismissing an employee, acts contrary to the provisions protecting an employee's right to freedom of association.

The protection of freedom of association, then, has two aspects:

 Employers and employees must be protected against state infringement of the right. If the legislature enacts legislation that infringes the right, it may be challenged on the basis that it is in conflict with section 23 of the Constitution (South African National defense Union v Min of Defense and another).
 Employees’ freedom of association should be protected against attempts by the employer to infringe this right. It is in this regard that the LRA plays an important role.

Although the right to freedom of association is not only guaranteed in terms of the LRA, but also in terms of the Constitution, the scope of this right has not been tested. The question has arisen, however, of whether or not groups excluded from the application of the LRA, such as the Defense Force, are entitled to form and join trade unions, based on their constitutional right to freedom of association. The issue came before the Constitutional Court in SANDU v Minister of Defence. The court found that, although uniformed members of the South African Defense Force, the Secret Service and the Intelligence Service are excluded from the protection of the LRA, they may claim the right to freedom of association under section 23 of the Constitution.

Section 4 of the LRA states that all employees have the rights set out in that section. Section 4 therefore applies to senior managers as well. This may in some circumstances, "and does," cause problems both for employers and for the managers themselves. A senior manager involved in the formulation of an employer's approach to the annual wage negotiations (including its "final offer") may not be able to perform his functions properly if he is also a member of the union sitting on the other side of the bargaining table. It might be difficult, too, for the manager not to divulge confidential information, bearing on the bargaining process, to the union.

This issue arose for decision in the case of Independent Municipal and Allied Trade Union v Rustenburg Transitional Council, where the Labour Court declared unconstitutional a prohibition on senior managers holding executive positions within a union. The court indicated, however, that there are limitations to the scope of section 4. It pointed out that, in terms of common-law principles, an employee owes an employer a "duty of fidelity"—a duty to act in good faith. Because of the conflicting aims of trade unions and employers, the joining of a union and participation in its affairs may, in terms of common-law principles at least, and especially in the case of senior managerial employees, breach this duty of fidelity.

Common-law principles have been amended by the Constitution, and especially by section 4 of the LRA. The court in IMATU stated that the rights granted in section 4 are "unequivocal and unconditional," but that they are not unlimited. Employees, including senior managers, are entitled to join trade unions and take part in their affairs, but this does not relieve them of their contractual obligations to their employers. If, for example, an employee takes time off without permission to attend to union affairs, the employee may be disciplined on the basis of misconduct. If a senior employee, part of whose job it is to conduct disciplinary enquiries, refuses to undertake this task when union members are disciplined, this will amount to incapacity.

A senior employee who has access to confidential information of the employer must also, the court added, tread carefully when conducting trade-union business, and ensure that this information is not disclosed.

In FAWU v The Cold Chain, where an employee was offered a managerial position as an alternative to retrenchment, on condition that he no longer participated in the activities of the union, he refused and was retrenched, and the court found his dismissal to be automatically unfair, holding that there was nothing absurd in permitting a senior managerial employee to participate in the activities of a trade union—provided that the employee complies with his contractual obligations.

In Kroukam v SA Airlink, the court held that Kroukam's dismissal was automatically unfair in terms of section 187(1)(d) of LRA, because he had been dismissed for union activities and for initiating litigation against the company on behalf of his union. The court, in delivering its verdict, cautioned against the argument that participation in trade-union activities destroys the trust relationship between employer and employee; such an argument is unacceptable on policy grounds.

Managerial employees, therefore, must balance the right to freedom of association with their common-law duty to act in good faith towards their employers. If a manager, for example, divulges information to the trade union that he acquired by virtue of his managerial position, he may be disciplined.

Sections 6 and 7 of the LRA grant and protect employer rights to freedom of association in terms similar to those granted to employees: to form, join and participate in the activities of employers’ organisations.

Freedom not to associate and freedom to dissociate 
Freedom of association is generally regarded as a positive right; it protects the rights of employees and employers actively to form collective entities and to join them. In the case of trade unions, this positive right is protected by prohibiting both the State and employers from infringing it.

Freedom of association also has a negative aspect, however. This does not refer to any disadvantages or drawbacks it may have; it refers to the right not to associate. In the context of labour relations, the principle of freedom of non-association means that no person may force an employee to belong to a union in the first place, or to belong to a union other than the union of the employee's choice.

Where the limits of freedom of non-association lie is the subject of considerable controversy.

Closed-shop agreements exist where an employer and a trade union conclude a collective agreement in terms of which the employer undertakes to employ or retain in its services only those employees who have joined the union. The closed-shop agreement forces employees to join a certain union if they are to keep their jobs. A closed-shop agreement could be seen as an infringement of the employees’ right not to associate.

Sometimes mention is made of the freedom of dissociation. This refers to the situation where employees who have decided to associate with each other also decide to prevent other employees from associating with them: for example, where the union's constitution stipulates that only employees in a certain industry may join.

In practice, this freedom of dissociation is not so controversial. More controversial is that the constitutions of some unions state that the union has the right to refuse to admit a person as a member of that union even if that person is eligible for membership. A constitution may also provide for the expulsion of members. This becomes vitally important if there is a closed-shop agreement, because the refusal of membership of the union may mean the loss of a job.

Dispute resolution 
If a person alleges that one of the rights relating to freedom of association has been infringed, the dispute-resolution procedure contained in section 9 of the LRA applies. Disputes about the interpretation or application of the right to freedom of association should be referred for conciliation to a bargaining council, a statutory council or (if no council exists) the Commission for Conciliation, Mediation and Arbitration. If the dispute remains unresolved, it should be referred to the Labour Court for adjudication, unless the parties agree to arbitration.

Union security arrangements 
The Constitution allows for "union security arrangements contained in collective agreements." There is no firm definition of the term "union-security arrangements," but it is generally viewed as a generic term for a collective agreement between an employer or employers’ organisation and a trade union or trade unions, in terms of which union membership, or alternatively the payment of trade union subscriptions, is a condition of employment for all employees. Clearly this infringes upon an employee's right to freedom of association. Union security arrangements therefore require compulsory union membership, or compulsory payment of a union subscription.

In the South African context, the term "union-security arrangements" refers to the so-called "closed-shop" and "agency-shop" agreements. The only limits set in the Constitution are that such agreements must

 be contained in a collective agreement; and
 comply with the general limitations clause of the Constitution.

The two types of union security arrangements are illustrated by way of the following example:

K employs 100 employees. 60 of them belong to trade union T. These members pay a monthly membership fee of R20. From the other 40 employees 10 belong to union R and 30 are non-unionised. Every year with wage negotiations, T negotiates with K and the increase agreed on is applied across the board. T feels that it does all the hard work which both union and non-union members benefit from. If T concludes an agency-shop agreement with K, it will mean that K will deduct an agency fee of R20 from the salaries of all the other 40 employees and pay it over to T. The other 40 employees do not have to become members of T [... but] the members of R will pay their own membership fee for R as well as the R20 agency fee.
If K and T conclude a closed-shop agreement, it will mean that all other 40 employees of K must become members of T. R will no longer be allowed to operate in the workplace. All 100 employees will have to pay the R20 membership fee to T.

Agency-shop agreements 
An agency-shop agreement is defined in section 25(1) of the LRA: "A representative trade union and an employers organisation may conclude a collective agreement, to be known as an agency shop agreement, requiring the employer to deduct an agreed agency fee from the wages of employees identified in the agreement who are not members of the trade union but are eligible for membership thereof."

An agency-shop agreement is concluded by a majority union and an employer or an employers’ organisation—concluded, that is, by way of a collective agreement. The employer must deduct an agreed agency fee from the salaries of the employees identified in the agreement. In this regard, it is important to note that it may be deducted only from those who are not members of the union but also from those who are eligible for membership. Conscientious objectors to the policies of the union (on religious or moral grounds) must pay the fee; the fee, in turn, must be paid into a fund administered by the DoL. The fee that non-members pay must not be higher than the subscription fee payable by members of the majority union. Agency fees are paid over to a separate account and may be used only for the benefit of all employees at the workplace. Agency fees may not be used for political affiliation and may not be used for any purpose other than advancing or protecting the socioeconomic interests of employees. The employer may deduct agency fees from the wages of employees without their authorisation.

Closed-shop agreements 
A closed shop is defined in section 26(1) of the LRA: "A representative trade union and an employer or employer’s organisation may conclude a collective agreement, to be known as a closed-shop agreement, requiring that all employees covered by the agreement be members of the trade union."

A closed-shop agreement is concluded by a majority union and an employer or an employers' organisation, by way of a collective agreement. The employees to be covered by the agreement must have a ballot before a closed-shop agreement is concluded. Two thirds of the employees (who will potentially be covered) who voted must have voted in favour of the agreement. Union subscription fees may not be used for political affiliation; they may be used only to advance the socioeconomic interests of the employees. Employees who were already employed when the closed-shop agreement came into effect, along with conscious objectors, may not be dismissed for refusing to join the union which is a party to a closed-shop agreement. A closed-shop agreement may be terminated if a majority of the employees votes for its termination. It is not unfair to dismiss an employee for refusing to join a union which is a party to a closed-shop agreement, or who is refused union membership, or has been expelled from a union which is a party to the agreement—provided that the refusal or expulsion is in accordance with the union's constitution, and provided that the reason for the refusal or expulsion is a fair one.

An employee may not be required to be a member of a majority union before the commencement of employment. The latter is called a post entry closed-shop agreement. The opposite of this is a pre-entry closed-shop agreement: that is, a closed-shop agreement that requires an employee to be a member of a majority trade union before employment. Pre-entry closed shops are not allowed in South Africa.

Distinction 
There is an important difference between the two: In the agency shop, employees are not compelled to be or to become members of the trade union. In the closed shop, however, all employees who are covered by the collective agreement must be or must become members of the trade union.

Controversy 
The reason for these agreements relates to the nature and practice of collective bargaining. Under certain circumstances, employees who are not members of a trade union will be bound by the provisions of an agreement entered into by the union. In other circumstances, the employer may, in the interests of administrative convenience, extend the provisions of a collective agreement to non-union members. In effect, employees who are not members of the trade union may derive benefits from a collective agreement entered into by a union. "Understandably," unions have reservations about this state of affairs. These non-union employees are sometimes called "free riders," because they derive benefits for free: They do not pay union subscriptions, but they still obtain the benefits of the union's collective bargaining. This is the main argument in favour of forcing employees either to belong to a union (in the case of closed-shop agreements) or to pay a fee (in the case of agency-shop agreements).

Those who support union-security arrangements argue that they are necessary to avoid free riders. Furthermore, there is a view that they encourage "responsible" unionism. They support collective bargaining by aiding the development of strong and representative trade unions. Such arrangements are said to give union organizers a sense of security, and to enable them to devote themselves to the long-term interest of their members, "instead of collecting subscriptions and trying to persuade reluctant employees to join." For some, the main justification for union-security arrangements is that they add to the power of the unions during the collective-bargaining process, creating a more effective counterbalance to the naturally superior economic power of the corporate employer. This they do by preventing the defection of members during wage bargaining which may lead to strike action.

There may also be some benefit in such arrangements for the employer. If all employees belong to one union (or contribute to that union), the employer need only deal with that specific union. As a collective-bargaining relationship grows, a certain pattern and consistency of collective bargaining can thus be formed.

On the other hand, those who consider that the unions already possess monopoly status and excessive power see union security arrangements, particularly the closed shop, "as a main cause of undesirable state of affairs at the workplace." The main arguments against union security arrangements are,

 in the case of closed-shop agreements, that they give more power to the unions, since the union controls the pool of applicants for the post;
 in the case of agency-shop arrangements, that workers who are members of minority unions end up paying double subscriptions (one for their union and one for the representative union); and
 that union security arrangements, particularly closed-shop arrangements, infringe the right not to be a member of a trade union or the freedom not to associate, which is an intrinsic part of the right of freedom of association.

The two ILO Conventions on freedom of association and collective bargaining do not make any express reference to the notion of union-security arrangements. The ILO Committee also left it to the practice and regulation of each state to authorise and, where necessary, to regulate the use of union-security clauses in practice.

According to the committee, union security arrangements are compatible with the ILO Conventions on freedom of association, provided that they are the results of free negotiations between workers’ organisations and employers. As long as this is the case, then, the international body will not interfere with them, provided that the law of a particular country does not go so far as to impose them generally and make union membership compulsory. However, when trade union security clauses are imposed by the law itself, then the right to join an organization of one's own choosing is compromised, and those provisions will be incompatible with the ILO Convention. Accordingly, ILO member states are at liberty to include or not to include in their constitutions and labour legislation provisions regulating union-security arrangements.

Despite the arguments in favour of agency shops and closed shops, it would appear prima facie that these types of agreement do infringe the employee's freedom of association. Particularly in the case of a closed shop, an employee is no longer free not to associate: The employee must belong to a specific trade union. Employees are no longer free to choose which union they want to belong to, or even if they want to belong to a union at all. If the employee is not a member of a particular trade union, or if he loses his trade-union membership in terms of the union's constitution, the employee may end up out of a job.

It has been argued, accordingly, that the closed-shop agreement amounts to an infringement of the employee's freedom of association, as protected by sections 18 and 23 of the Constitution. The situation is different in the case of agency shops: The employee still has the freedom to choose whether or not he wants to belong to the union which is party to the collective agreement—"that is if the employee wants to belong to a union in the first place."

The solution to this problem lies in a constitutional provision, section 23(6) of the Constitution, which provides that "national Legislation may recognize union security arrangements contained in collective agreements. To the extent that the legislation may limit a right in this Chapter, the limitation must comply with s 36(1)." In other words, union-security arrangements are permitted within the scheme of constitutional rights, and these arrangements may be recognized by national legislation (the LRA).

Agency shops and closed shops, then, are not automatically unconstitutional, but a limitation of any right by a union-security arrangement must comply with section 36(1) of the Constitution, which provides that a fundamental right, such as freedom of association, may be limited by legislation as long as that limitation is reasonable and justifiable in an open and democratic society based on human dignity, equality and freedom. Section 36(1) contains a list of the factors that must be considered:

 the nature of the right;
 the importance and purpose of the limitation of the right;
 the nature and extent of the limitation, and the purpose of the limitation; and
 whether or not there are less restrictive means to achieve this purpose.

Applied to agency and closed shops, the purpose of these arrangements is, at least in part, to enhance collective bargaining by the development of strong and powerful trade unions and stable bargaining relationships. (Collective bargaining is also protected by section 23 of the Constitution.)

While agency shops do not represent all that serious an infringement of freedom of association, it is clear that the closed-shop agreement does. The question (which still awaits an answer) is whether or not it is really necessary to force employees to become members of a union, especially when a less restrictive method—that is, the agency shop—exists.

Dispute resolution 
Disputes about collective agreements (including closed- and agency-shop agreements) must be referred to the Commission for Conciliation, Mediation and Arbitration for conciliation. If conciliation fails, any party to the dispute may refer the matter to arbitration. By way of exception, the LRA makes provision in this context for an appeal against an award issued by the Commission for Conciliation, Mediation and Arbitration commissioner. The arbitration award may be taken on appeal to the Labour Court.

Organisational rights

Purpose 
The LRA does not impose a legal obligation on employers to bargain collectively with unions. The law encourages collective bargaining; it does not compel it. One of the ways it seeks to do this is by enabling trade unions to acquire organisational rights in certain circumstances. The granting of organisational rights to a trade union is seen as a way of enabling that trade union to establish a collective-bargaining relationship with an employer or employer's organisation.

The trade union is the essential instrument for engaging in collective bargaining. The LRA sets certain minimum rights for trade unions (which may be expanded upon by agreement) in their engagement with employers. These organisational rights are granted to unions by the LRA to enable them to function more effectively, to build support at the workplace, and thereby to lay the foundations of a collective-bargaining relationship with the employer.

If the union, through the acquisition of organisational rights, gains sufficient membership and a significant presence in the workplace or industry, an employer or employers’ organisation may be persuaded to "recognize" the union for the purpose of collective bargaining.

Registration

Prerequisite 
Organisational rights are granted only to registered trade unions. The LRA does not compel trade unions and employers’ organisations to register, but it does encourage registration. It does this by granting most of the rights in the LRA only to registered unions. For instance, only a registered union may

 conclude collective agreements which are enforceable in terms of the LRA;
 apply for the establishment of a bargaining or a statutory council;
 apply for the establishment of a workplace forum;
 authorize a picket by its members; and
 exercise organisational rights.

Registration is not a prerequisite for protected strike action.

Procedure 
Once a trade union or employers' organisation has complied with the requirements set out in the LRA, the Registrar of Labour Relations must register the union or organisation. In respect of unions, there are four requirements to be met:

 The name of the union, and the shortened form of that name, may not resemble the name or shortened name of another union.
 The constitution of the union must comply with certain requirements.
 The union must have an address in South Africa.
 The union must be independent; it must not be under the control of the employer or employers’ organisation.

The first three requirements apply also in the case of an employers’ organisation; the last one, given the overlap, obviously does not.

Specific rights 
The LRA makes provision for granting of five types of organisational rights. Other organisational rights may also be granted which are not referred to in the LRA; these must be obtained through negotiation and agreement. The five types of organisational rights made provision for in the LRA are listed and discussed below:

 the right of access to the premises of the employer;
 the right to have trade-union membership fees deducted by way of a stop order;
 the right to elect shop stewards;
 the right of shop stewards to get time off for trade-union activities; and
 the right to disclosure of information.

Access to the workplace 
The logical place for contact between union representatives and the members they represent, as well as prospective members whom the union might recruit, is in the workplace. Section 12 of the LRA states that a registered trade union, sufficiently representative, has the right of access to the workplace. This right allows the union

 to enter the employer's premises, to recruit members, to communicate with members and also to serve members' interests;
 to hold meetings with employees at the workplace (but outside of working hours); and
 to let members vote at the employer's premises in union elections or ballots.

The purpose of this access is for the union to recruit new members, to communicate with existing ones and to serve the interests of union members in other ways.

The right of access refers to access for union officials, to be clear, not just anyone who is affiliated with union. Nor do such officials also not have free rein. The right of access is not unlimited. Section 12(4) states that the exercise of the union's right of access to the workplace may be subject to such conditions, as regards time and place, as are reasonable and necessary to protect life and property, or to prevent the undue disruption of work.

In the case of domestic workers, there is no right of access to workplace, given the intimate nature of the workplace.

Deduction of union fees 
This is the primary source of income for unions. Section 13 of the LRA grants unions the right to stop-order facilities. Union fees are used to perform the work and functions of the union, to hire officers and offices, and to provide training. There is no stipulation in the LRA or in related regulations as to how much unions are allowed to charge, but usually it is not much. The amount is determined by the constitution of the trade union.

Payment is voluntary: A member of a registered and sufficiently representative union may authorize the employer, in writing, to deduct union subscriptions from his wages. Usually this is done on the union membership form. The employer should start to make the deductions agreed to as soon as possible, and should pay the subscription over to the union not later than the fifteenth day of each month.

The employee may subsequently revoke authorization, however, on written notice of a month, to both the employer and the trade union. At end of that period, employer must stop making the deduction.

When paying deductions to the trade union, the employer must also furnish union with

 a list of union members from whose wages deductions were made;
 details as to amounts deducted and paid to the union;
 the period to which the deductions relate; and
 copies of all written notices of revocation of authorization by union members.

Election of shop stewards 
Shop stewards are union representatives, "the infantry of the trade union." They play a very important role in industrial relations, being in the best position to represent the union in the workplace and to relay information about the workplace to the union. They look after the day-to-day operation of the union and the protection and assistance of workers with their work-related problems. Their statutory role is to ensure compliance with the law and with collective agreements.

Section 14 of the LRA provides that members of a registered trade union, provided that the union represents the majority of employees in the workplace, are entitled to elect trade-union representatives if the union has at least ten members in the workplace. The nomination, election, terms of office and removal from office of representatives are governed by the union's constitution.

The number of representatives is determined according to the number of union members in the specific workplace. For example, if there are only between ten and fifty union members, there will be two representatives. The amount increases on a sliding scale. The maximum number of representatives is twenty.

The functions of union representatives are set out in section 14(4) of the LRA:

 to assist and represent the employee at his request in grievance and disciplinary  proceedings;
 to monitor the employer's compliance with the LRA and all other applicable laws;
 to report alleged contraventions of LRA or collective agreements to the employer, the representative trade union and the responsible authority or agency; and
 to perform any other function agreed between representative trade union and the employer.

Shop stewards are employed by the employer, not by the union. Grogan describes "the difficult position in which shop stewards find themselves," keeping two sets of books, or attempting "to serve two masters," their employer and their trade union—masters whose interests are often diametrically opposed. "This situation is particularly difficult," writes Grogan, "when shop stewards also occupy supervisory or managerial positions." The courts have held, however, that employers may not for this reason forbid managerial employees from being elected as shop stewards; the most they can do is to discipline them if their union role actually prevents them from performing their managerial duties properly.

The distinction between union officials and union representatives (like shop stewards) is an important one. Trade-union officials are employees of the trade union; they perform various duties for the trade union in this capacity. Trade-union representatives, on the other hand, remain employees of the particular employer at the workplace, although they also represent the union in various ways within the workplace where they are employed.

Time off for trade-union activities 
Section 14(5) of LRA entitles the trade-union representative to "reasonable" time off, during working hours, without loss of pay, to perform union functions and be trained in any subject relevant to performance of those functions. The meaning of "reasonable" in relation to paid time off is not stated in the Act.

Attendance at union conferences and meetings may require the office-bearer to be absent from work. In terms of section 15(1), the office-bearer of a registered, sufficiently representative trade union is entitled to take reasonable leave during working hours for the purpose of performing the functions of his office. In terms of section 15(2), the union and employer may agree on the number of days’ leave, the number of days’ paid leave and the conditions attached to any leave. If the union and the employer are unable to reach an agreement, the dispute may be determined by an award made in terms of section 21 of the LRA.

No benchmark for shop stewards’ leave emerges from the decided cases, but arbitrators have generally accepted ten days per annum as "reasonable." Employers may take disciplinary action against shop stewards if they exceed or abuse their powers by, for example, intimidating employees, including other shop stewards. Employers are entitled to refuse to deal with shop stewards if they have committed serious misconduct.

Item 4(2) of the Code of Good Practice: Dismissal, seeks to discourage victimization of shop stewards by requiring employers to inform and "consult" their unions before taking disciplinary action against them for any reason. A number of cases concerning the dismissal of shop stewards have reached the courts. The approach in such cases is to determine

 the dominant reason for the dismissal; and then
 whether that reason relates to the performance by the shop steward of his or her duties.

If it does, the dismissal is ‘automatically’ unfair, and the shop steward will invariably be reinstated.

Disclosure of information 
For a trade union to do its job effectively, it may need access to certain information. Section 16 provides for the provision of information both to trade-union representatives and to trade unions. Only registered unions which represent the majority of the employees in the workplace are entitled to rely on section 16.

Only relevant information must be disclosed: That is to say, in terms of section 16(2), all relevant information that will allow the representative trade union to engage effectively in consultation or collective bargaining must be disclosed. The information must be relevant to the effective performance of functions in terms of section 14(4). There is, in other words, an important link between the information required and the function of the representative. Often the requirement of "relevance" means relevance to the performance of a specific task.

Typically the information in question is in the hands of the employer. A common example is production plans or plans for restructuring, which will affect or cause retrenchment.

The registered majority union has a right to information when the employer is actually involved in consultation or bargaining with the union, or when consultation or bargaining is about to start. For example, at annual wage negotiations, the employer may argue that its financial position, both short- and long-term, is poor. The trade union may dispute this and demand that all relevant information on which the employer bases this argument be disclosed. The employer would then have to furnish, for example, proof of cancellation of orders, and reasons for such cancellation, any existing and possible new orders, and financial statements.

The employer, however, cannot be expected to disclose information which

 is unavailable;
 is irrelevant to the issue or issues under discussion;
 is legally privileged;
 could harm the employer's business interests if disclosed; or
 is private personal information relating to an employee, unless the employee has consented to the disclosure of such information. It is also possible for the employer to convey such information to the union without disclosing identities.

If the employer regards certain types of information as confidential, it must notify the union of this fact.

Disputes on the disclosure of information are to be referred to the Commission for Conciliation, Mediation and Arbitration, which will attempt to settle the dispute through conciliation and, failing that, arbitration.

Different levels of representativeness by unions for different rights 
Whether a trade union is entitled to organisational rights depends on the level of representativeness of the trade union in the workplace, which can be either majority representation or "sufficient" representation. If a union represents the majority of workers, it will have access to all organisational rights. If the union is sufficiently representative, it will have access only to certain organisational rights: the rights of access, leave and stop-order facilities. The rights to elect shop stewards and to disclosure of information, on the other hand, are reserved for unions that have as members the majority of the employees in the workplace.

Usually, only a single union will be seeking organisational rights, but two or more unions may also act together to do so.

Majority representation 
Where the union has a majority, representing 50 per cent plus one, or more, of all employees in the workplace, it enjoys the following organisational rights:

 the right of access to the workplace;
 the right to have membership fees deducted from wages;
 the right to elect shop stewards;
 the right of shop stewards to leave for union activities; and
 the right of disclosure of information.

Sufficient representation 
Where the union is "sufficiently represented," it represents less than the majority of employees in the workplace. There is no fixed rule as to "sufficient representation;" it is decided on a case-by-case basis. A sufficiently representative union enjoys the following organisational rights:

 the right of access to the workplace;
 the right to deduction of membership fees from wages; and
 the right to leave of shop stewards for trade-union activities.

If the union is a member of a bargaining council, it enjoys the following organisational rights:

 access to the workplace; and
 deduction of membership fees from wages.

If it is a minority union, it may enforce its rights through collective bargaining and industrial action. Two or more trade unions may act jointly to acquire rights.

The LRA does not define "sufficient representation," but it does give guidelines. Factors to be taken into account would include the nature of the workplace and the industry involved, as well as the presence or absence of other unions with membership in the workplace. The approximate figure is thirty per cent.

In UPUSA v Komming Knitting, the Commissioner extended the right to access the workplace, together with the right to deductions of union subscriptions, to a union which, at the time of the award, represented just seven employees out of 31. The Commissioner made this decision on the basis

 that the union was the only union organising and recruiting at the workplace;
 that it had been present in the workplace since shortly after the employer's inception; and
 that its current low level of representation was due to high labour turnover.

The Commissioner held that the union seemed capable of recruiting a majority of the workers at the workplace.

In SACTWU v Marley, the Commission for Conciliation, Mediation and Arbitration refused organisational rights to a union with 42 per cent representivity, on the basis that another union represented 56 per cent of employees in the workplace, and because the employer had a long association with the other union, which included an agency-shop agreement.

In NUMSA v Feltex Foam, the question was whether differing degrees of "sufficient representativeness" could be set for different organisational rights: a higher degree for gaining access to workplace, for example, than for stop-order facilities. The Commission for Conciliation, Mediation and Arbitration held that there have to be very special circumstances to allow him to distinguish between such rights. If the arbitrator is prepared to grant one of these rights, in other words, there would have to be special circumstances to justify a refusal to grant any of the others.

In Organisation of Labour Affairs v Old Mutual Life Assurance, the Commissioner was prepared to order the employer to grant access to the workplace and stop-order facilities to a union with level of representivity which would not ordinarily have permitted the granting of these rights, on the basis that the rights had been granted to other unions with lower representivity. A similar approach was adopted in Group 4 Falck v DUSWO.

The effect of these decisions is that, when an employer grants organisational rights to a union with, for example, only ten per cent representivity, the employer cannot really argue that another union seeking organisation rights must have at least thirty per cent.

Section 18 allows an employer and majority union in a workplace, as well as parties to a bargaining council, to establish by collective agreement the level of representativeness required for the purposes of gaining access, deductions and leave at a particular workplace.

The only limit is that the agreed threshold must be applied equally to all unions seeking to exercise any, or all, of these rights.

"Workplace" 
The "workplace" is defined in section 213 of LRA. There is a distinction to be drawn, in this regard, between the public service and the private sector.

 In the public sector, the workplace is the national department, provincial administration, provincial department or organisational component contemplated in the Public Service Act.
 In the private sector, the workplace is the place where employees of the employer work.

If the private employer has two businesses, independent of each other by reason of size or function or organisation, the place where the employees work in connection with each independent operation constitutes the workplace for that operation. This foresees the possibility that geographically distinct operations may constitute one workplace. Commission for Conciliation, Mediation and Arbitration commissioners been unwilling to accept too easily that geographically distinct places of work constitute separate workplaces.

In Speciality Stores v SACCAWU, the Labour Court was loath to find, in the absence of proof by the trade union, that different stores of a retailer constituted different workplaces. The court also made it clear that the onus rests on the union to prove that two operations are two different workplaces.

Thresholds 
Employers and majority unions are permitted to conclude collective agreements that set thresholds for the acquisition of rights under sections 12 (union access to the workplace), 13 (stop-orders) and 15 (time off). This right is conferred by section 18 ("Right to establish thresholds of representativeness"), which reads as follows:

(1) An employer and a registered trade union whose members are a majority of the employees employed by that employer in a workplace, or the parties to a bargaining council, may conclude a collective agreement establishing a threshold of representativeness required in respect of one or more of the organisational rights referred to in sections 12, 13 and 15.
(2) A collective agreement concluded in terms of subsection (1) is not binding unless the thresholds of representativeness in the collective agreement are applied equally to any registered trade union seeking any of the organisational rights referred to in that subsection.

A threshold agreement, then, is an agreement to restrict certain rights to unions with a certain percentage of representation. The idea is to prevent union fragmentation, and to make bargaining genuinely collective.

Acquisition of organisational rights 
Trade unions may acquire organisational rights in the following ways:

 through collective agreement;
 through membership of a bargaining council;
 through strike action; or
 through the section-21 procedure.

Through collective agreement 
The LRA makes provision in section 20 for a registered trade union and an employer or employers' organisation to conclude a collective agreement that regulates organisational rights. This means that, even if the trade union is not representative, it could have organisational rights on which the parties agreed.

This route generally begins with an approach by the union to the employer, and a request that it grant the union organisational rights. Section 20 does not prescribe any representivity requirements before the employer will be entitled to grant such rights in a collective agreement. Even a union with only a small degree of representivity, therefore, may obtain organisational rights.

Through membership of a bargaining council 
In terms of section 19 of the LRA, a registered trade union, if party to a bargaining council, automatically acquires the right of access to the premises, together with the right to have trade union subscriptions deducted by stop orders, in respect of all workplaces falling within the jurisdiction of the bargaining council. Again, it does not matter, for the purposes of this route, how representative the union is in the specific workplace. A union acquires these rights irrespective of whether it is sufficiently representative or not.

Through s 21 procedure 
Briefly, the section-21 procedure involves notice by the union to the employer of its intention to seek organisational rights, consultation between union and employer in an attempt to reach a collective agreement, and referral by the union of a dispute, if any, to the CCMA, which will attempt to settle the matter through conciliation, failing which it will arbitrate the dispute and issue a binding award. The union in this case must be registered, and must enjoy a certain level of representation in the workplace.

The onus rests on the union to notify the employer, in writing, that it intends to seek the organisational rights conferred by the Act. The notice must contain the following information:

 the workplace in which the union seeks to exercise the rights;
 the representivity of the trade union in that workplace;
 the rights that the trade union wishes to exercise; and
 the manner in which the trade union wishes to exercise those rights.

The notice must be accompanied by a certified copy of the trade union registration certificate.

Within thirty days of receiving the notice, employer must meet with the union. The parties must then try to conclude a collective agreement regulating the manner in which the organisational rights will be exercised. The employer may refuse to grant union rights on the grounds there is a dispute as to what constitutes a "workplace," or because the employer argues that the union does not enjoy the required degree of representativeness.

If the parties fail to conclude a collective agreement, either of the parties may refer the dispute, in writing, to the Commission for Conciliation, Mediation and Arbitration for conciliation. If conciliation fails, either party may request that the dispute be arbitrated. The CCMA has jurisdiction to arbitrate only if the union has complied with all the provisions of section 21, which are peremptory. Failure by the union to comply with them will mean that Commission for Conciliation, Mediation and Arbitration may not deal with the dispute.

The CCMA commissioner will be called upon to decide whether or not the union is representative. Section 21 authorizes him to make inquiries, conduct a ballot and take all other relevant information into account.

Once the actual number of members has been established, section 21(8) provides that the commissioner

 must seek to minimize the proliferation of trade union representation in a single workplace and, where possible, to encourage a system of a representative trade union in a workplace; and
 must seek to minimize the financial and administrative burden of requiring an employer to grant organisational rights to more than one registered union.

Here the LRA gives "clear legislative support for the principle of majoritarianism."

In this regard, the commissioner must consider

 the nature of the workplace;
 the nature of the one or more organisational rights that the registered trade union seeks to exercise;
 the nature of the sector in which the workplace is situated; and
 the organisational history at the workplace or any other workplace of the employer.

If the employer is of the opinion that the union is no longer representative, it may refer matter to the Commission for Conciliation, Mediation and Arbitration, requesting that it withdraw the organisational rights. The commissioner may withdraw any of the organisational rights once conferred which are exercised by any other registered trade union in respect of that workplace, if that other union has ceased to be a representative union.

In order to determine the membership or support of the registered trade union, the Commissioner may

 make any necessary inquiries;
 where appropriate, conduct a ballot of the relevant employees; and
 take into account any other relevant information.

The employer must co-operate with the Commissioner and make available any information and facilities that are reasonably necessary for this purpose. An employer who alleges that a union is no longer a representative trade union may apply to the CCMA to withdraw any of the organisational rights previously granted.

In summary, the section 21 procedure runs as follows:

 The union notifies the employer in writing that it intends to exercise organisational rights.
 Within thirty days of the notice, employer and union meet in an attempt to conclude a collective agreement.
 If a collective agreement is concluded, they need go no further with section 21; if not, either party refers the dispute in writing to the Commission for Conciliation, Mediation and Arbitration for conciliation.
 If the matter is not successfully conciliated, there are two options:
 Either party may request arbitration, where after a Commissioner may determine the representativeness of the union and the manner in which rights are to be exercised. The Commissioner may consider an application for withdrawal of the rights, and relevancy and confidentiality of the information. An arbitration award is binding on the parties.
 The union may strike, or the employer may lock out:
 If the union gives notice of its intention to strike, it may not refer the dispute to arbitration for a period of twelve months from the date of the notice.
 The same condition applies to an employer giving notice of a lock-out.

The LRA Amendment Bill now before parliament proposes to amend section 21. Section 8A of the proposed amendment would allow a non-majority trade union to bring shop stewards into the workplace.

Through strike action 
The LRA would prohibit a strike in support of a demand that the employer grant all or some organisational rights to a union, because such a dispute may be referred to arbitration in terms of section 21. Section 65(2)(a) specifically permits a union which would otherwise have the right to refer a dispute about organisational rights to arbitration in terms of section 21 to embark on strike action in an attempt to force employer to grant these rights.

A trade union, including a minority union, may therefore strike in support of a demand for organisational rights even if it does not meet the statutory threshold for acquiring such rights. Except for the right to information, in fact, organisational rights are the only rights conferred by the LRA over which strikes are permitted.

This is the consequence of NUMSA v Bader Bop, where NUMSA, although not a majority union, sought to acquire the right to elect shop stewards by striking. The lower courts were divided. A divided Labour Appeal Court held that minority unions could not do strike for such a right because,

 once the union conceded that it lacked a majority, there would be no dispute over which to strike; and
 such a strike would be hit by section 65(1)(c), which prohibits strikes over disputes that either party may refer to arbitration.

This judgment was overturned by the Constitutional Court, however, which held that the minority unions may strike in support of demands for organisational rights to which they are not entitled under the LRA.

The Constitutional Court found that nothing in section 20 of the LRA precludes a collective agreement granting collective-bargaining rights, even if the qualification for representativity is not met. The court's interpretation of this was that, if a minority union asks for, but does not succeed in acquiring, the organisational rights in question, and if conciliation subsequently fails, the dispute-resolution mechanism is to strike for it.

This judgment has been severely criticized.

If the union uses the strike remedy, but is unsuccessful in forcing employer to grant the rights, the union loses the right to use the section-21 procedure for one year from date on which notice was given of the intention to go on strike.

Dispute resolution for organisational rights 
If there is a dispute about the interpretation of organisational rights, any party may refer the dispute in writing to the Commission for Conciliation, Mediation and Arbitration for conciliation and, if conciliation fails, for arbitration.

Disputes about disclosure of information follow the same route. In determining the dispute, the Commissioner must strike a balance between the employer's right to privacy and the interests of sound collective bargaining. The Commissioner has a fairly wide discretion to make a suitable award to achieve this.

Collective bargaining 
The legal rules relating to freedom of association and organisational rights are all aimed at making collective bargaining possible. There are specific rules that govern the collective bargaining process and the result thereof: collective agreements.

Neither the Constitution nor the LRA defines "collective bargaining." This is primarily because the law does not impose a legal duty to bargain on employers and trade unions.

Collective bargaining must be understood as a process. The process of collective bargaining entails negotiations between the two parties:

 a union on the one hand; and
 an employer or an employers’ organisation on the other hand.

Broadly, then, the collective-bargaining process may be defined as a process whereby employers (or employers’ organisations) bargain with employee representatives (trade unions) about terms and conditions of employment, and about other matters of mutual interest.

Unlike mere consultation, collective bargaining presumes a willingness from each party, not only to listen to and consider the representations of the other party, but also to abandon its own fixed positions where possible, in order to find common ground.

Bargaining occurs, inter alia,

 where two opposing parties exchange demands and make counter-demands;
 where they propose (and accept or reject) compromises;
 where they negotiate; and
 where one party places pressure on the other to give in to its demands.

Bargaining, then, is a dynamic process.

Collective bargaining is mainly concerned with disputes of interest, but not to the exclusion of disputes of right.

The word "collective" refers to the fact that employees join in trade unions to increase their power in bargaining with employers over wages, working conditions and any other matters of mutual interest between them. It is important to note that, on the workers' side, only trade unions may engage in collective bargaining. Although a single employer can engage in collective bargaining, an individual employee cannot, by definition, engage in collective bargaining.

If successful, collective bargaining leads to a settlement and the conclusion of a collective agreement. If it fails, there are several options available to the employer or the union, including

 resort to a lock-out or a strike; and
 submitting the dispute to mediation.

When a trade union enters into the collective-bargaining process, it will normally have one of three objectives in mind:

 The first, and most important, is the regulation of terms and conditions of employment.
 The second is regulation of the relationship between the union and the employer in whose workplace it has members. The union may negotiate organisational rights with an employer.
 Linked to the first three objectives, the union may wish to attempt to resolve a dispute that has arisen between it and the employer.

Bargaining fora 
The LRA makes provision for the establishment of two institutions within which collective bargaining may take place:

 bargaining councils; and
 statutory councils.

The establishment, composition and function of bargaining councils and statutory councils are regulated in some detail by the LRA. Employers and trade unions remain free, however, to agree to their own collective-bargaining fora and procedures. The Act, however, does not regulate this "non-statutory collective bargaining" in any detail; it is left to the employer and the trade union to reach agreement on issues such as

 where the collective bargaining will take place (at industry, enterprise or plant level);
 when the collective bargaining will take place;
 on what topics collective-bargaining will occur;
 who will represent the parties during the collective-bargaining process;
 which employees will be covered by the collective-bargaining process; and
 the precise procedures to be followed.

The only facet of this type of bargaining regulated by the LRA is the legal effect and binding nature of collective agreements entered into.

Duty to bargain 
It could be argued that the constitutional right to bargain collectively (s 23(5)) includes both a legally enforceable right to bargain collectively, as well as a corresponding duty to bargain collectively on the other party to the relationship. Since the LRA does not create a duty to bargain, this may give rise to the argument that the Act does not go far enough in protecting and giving content to the constitutional right. This debate may have to be solved by the courts in the future. For now, however, there is no general duty to bargain on employers and trade unions in terms of the LRA. An employer may refuse to engage with a trade union; in turn, the trade union may take strike action.

The question of whether the constitutional right to bargain collectively includes a duty on the other party has arisen in connection with one group of persons not covered by the Act: members of the South African National Defence Force (SANDF). In three separate disputes, the High Court had to consider whether the South African National Defense Force Union (SANDU) may rely on the provisions of section 23 in order to obtain a court order to require the State to bargain collectively with it. These decisions, and their arguments, were contradictory.

The SCA, on appeal, held that the constitutional provision does not impose a judicially enforceable duty to bargain on employers or employees. On further appeal, however, the Constitutional court left the question open. It did point out, however, that the contrary approach could create difficulties. It came close, then, to agreeing with the SCA that no duty to bargain collectively exists in South African labour law.

Although the LRA does not compel parties to bargain with each other, it encourages collective bargaining through the granting of organisational rights, the right to establish bargaining institutions and closed-shop and agency-shop agreements. Should an employer refuse to bargain, the Act allows for strike action by employees to convince the employer to bargain. A refusal to bargain includes:

 the employer's refusal to recognise a trade union as a bargaining agent;
 the employer's refusal to establish a bargaining council;
 the employer's withdrawal of recognition of a collective bargaining agent;
 the employer's resignation as a party to a bargaining council; and
 the employer disputing appropriate bargaining units, levels and topics.

Disputes regarding refusal to bargain must first be referred to the Commission for Conciliation, Mediation and Arbitration for an advisory award. An advisory award provides guidance only; it is not binding on the parties.

Bargaining agents 
Collective bargaining is performed by bargaining agents, namely trade unions and employers’ organisations. The LRA sets requirements for unions and organisations relating to registration. A trade union is defined as an association of employees whose principal purpose is to regulate the relations between employers or employers’ organisations and employees. Only employees may be members of a trade union. Job seekers and ex-employees may not be members of a trade union.

To qualify as a trade union, an association of employees need not be registered. Registration is beneficial, however, since only a registered trade union is entitled to rights, such as the right to

 conclude a collective agreement enforceable under the LRA;
 acquire organisational rights;
 be a member of a bargaining council, statutory council and workplace forum; and
 conclude closed-shop and agency-shop agreements.

The powers and functions of a bargaining council are outlined in section 28 of the LRA. A bargaining council has three main functions:

 to conclude collective agreements;
 to enforce those collective agreements; and
 to prevent and resolve labour disputes.

Levels of bargaining 
Collective bargaining can take place at plant level, sector level or industry level. The LRA encourages collective bargaining at sector or industry level. Provision is made for the establishment of bargaining councils for a particular sector. It is at this level that bargaining will take place in bargaining councils. Moreover, bargaining councils may be established in the private as well as the public sector. The private sector is the economic sector in which the State is not the employer; in the public sector, the State is the employer.

Disputes requiring bargaining council to resolve 
 Disputes about freedom of association: A bargaining council only can conciliate these disputes, failing which they should be referred to the Labour Court for adjudication.
 Disputes of interest in an essential service: A bargaining council can conciliate and arbitrate these disputes.
 Disputes about severance pay: A bargaining council can conciliate and arbitrate these disputes.
 Disputes about unfair labour practices: A bargaining council can conciliate unfair-labour-practice disputes provided that they do not relate to discrimination. Discrimination disputes must be referred to the Commission for Conciliation, Mediation and Arbitration for conciliation, failing which they must go to the Labour Court for adjudication.
 Disputes that may lead to a strike or lock-out: A bargaining council only can conciliate these disputes.
 Dismissal disputes, if the reason for dismissal is based on operational requirements, for participating in an unprotected strike, for reasons connected to a closed-shop agreement, or automatically unfair: A bargaining council only can conciliate these
disputes.
 Disputes based on misconduct
and incapacity: A bargaining council may conciliate and arbitrate these disputes by way of the con-arb procedure.

Collective agreements 
The main goal of collective bargaining between an employer and a trade union is to reach consensus about certain matters and formalise their relationship by means of a collective agreement. A collective agreement regulates the rights and duties of parties, as well as the terms and conditions of the employment of workers.

In terms of section 213 of the LRA, a collective agreement is a written agreement concerning terms and conditions of employment or any other matter of mutual interest concluded by one or more registered trade unions, on the one hand and, on the other

 one or more employees;
 one or more registered employers’ organisations; or
 one or more employers and one or more registered employers’ organisations.

The parties, therefore, are

 a registered trade union; and
 the employer/s and/or registered employers' organisation/s.

Requirements 
There are three important elements that distinguish a collective agreement from any other agreement between employees and employers:

 A collective agreement must be in writing.
 Only a registered trade union can be a party to a collective agreement. Agreement with unregistered trade union not a collective agreement.
 A collective agreement must regulate terms and conditions of employment or any other matter of mutual interest between a trade union and the employer or employers’ organisations.

In writing 
A collective agreement need not be signed by the parties to the agreement to be valid. All that is required is that the agreement be in writing. It is not even necessary that the collective agreement be contained in a single document. It would, however, be advisable for the parties to the agreement to sign a single written document, as this would assist in eliminating later disputes as to whether or not an agreement was actually entered into, and what the content of the agreement was.

Registration 
Only registered unions may be parties to collective agreements, but a union being unregistered does not mean that the union may not conclude an agreement with an employer; it simply means that the agreement will fall outside the scope of the LRA, and will not be enforceable in terms of the LRA. A single employer may conclude a collective agreement; a single employee cannot. The reason for this is the inequality of power between an employer and a single employee, and that a single employee is not a "collective".

Content 
The definition also states what topics must be regulated by a collective agreement. It must deal with the terms and conditions of employment, and other matters of mutual interest between the parties. Terms and conditions of employment relate to those substantive provisions of the employment relationship, like working hours, remuneration and leave. Collective agreements can also regulate the granting of organisational rights to registered unions.

Binding effect 
A distinction must be drawn between parties to the agreement and members of the parties to the agreement. Section 23 of the LRA provides that the following entities or persons are bound by a collective agreement:

 the parties to the agreement;
 each party to the agreement and the members of every other party to the agreement, in so far as the provisions are applicable to them;
 members of a registered trade union and employers who are members of a registered employers’ organisation that are party to the collective agreement if it regulates
 terms and conditions of employment; or
 the conduct of the employers in relation to their employees or the conduct of the employees in relation to their employer.
 employees who are not members of the registered trade union or unions party to the agreement, if
 the employees are identified in the agreement;
 the agreement expressly binds the employees; and
 the trade union or unions represent the majority of all the employees employed in the workplace.

A collective agreement binds for the whole period of the collective agreement every person bond in terms of section (1)(c) who was a member at the time it became binding, or who becomes a member after it became binding, whether or not that person continues to be a member of the registered trade union or registered employers’ organisation for the duration of the collective agreement.

Contracts of employment 
Where applicable, a collective agreement varies any contract of employment between an employee and an employer if they are both bound by the collective agreement.

Termination 
Unless the collective agreement provides otherwise, any party to a collective agreement that is concluded for an indefinite period may terminate the agreement by giving reasonable notice in writing to the other parties.

Workplace fora 
To encourage workers’ participation in the workplace, the concept of a "workplace forum" has been introduced by the LRA. A workplace forum is an in-house institution promoting workers’ participation in decision making at the workplace. Workplace fora are intended to deal with non-wage-related issues such as restructuring, introduction of new technology, new work methods, and the like.

It is important not to confuse a trade union and a workplace forum, as the latter is not a bargaining structure:

 A union is a juristic body; a forum is not.
 A union deals with wage-related issues; a forum deals with non-wage-related issues.
 A union can embark on industrial action; a forum cannot.

All employees, including non-union members, may be members of a forum. Senior managerial employees, however, may not be members of a forum. Only registered trade unions or trade unions acting jointly, representing the majority of all employees employed in the workplace, may apply for the establishment of a forum.

A forum may be established in any workplace of employers with more than 100 employees, either through a collective agreement or through the intervention of the CCMA. Only larger employers, therefore, will be involved in fora.

A forum must meet regularly. Its functions are to consult on certain matters and to have joint decision making on other matters.

Consultation 
Consultation entails that the employer

 allows the forum to make representations and to advance alternative proposals; and
 considers and responds to these. If the employer disagrees with them, it must state the reasons for disagreeing.

Consultation must take place before the employer implements any proposal.

Joint decision making 
Joint decision making requires the employer to consult and reach consensus with a forum.

Matters for consultation 
Matters for consultation include (unless they are regulated by a collective agreement) proposals relating to

 restructuring the workplace (for example, the introduction of new technology and new work methods);
 changes in the organisation of work;
 total or partial plant closure;
 mergers and transfers of ownership in so far as they affect the employees;
 the retrenchment of employees;
 exemption from any collective agreement or law;
 job grading;
 criteria for merit increases or the payment of discretionary bonuses;
 education and training;
 product development plans; and
 export promotion.

A bargaining council or a representative union and an employer may conclude a collective agreement granting a forum the right to be consulted about additional matters that fall within the council's registered scope.

Matters for joint decision making 
Matters for joint decision making cannot be regulated by a collective agreement. Matters for joint decision making relate to

 disciplinary codes and procedures;
 the proper regulation of the workplace (except for work-related performance);
 measures designed to protect and advance persons disadvantaged by unfair discrimination; and
 changes by employer-representatives on boards of employer-controlled schemes with regard to social benefits.

A representative union and the employer may also enter into a collective agreement conferring on the forum joint decision making in respect of additional matters or removing other matters.

In fulfilling its duties to consult and to have joint decision making, an employer is required to disclose all relevant information that will allow the forum to participate effectively in consultation and joint decision making. The employer is not obliged to disclose information, however,

 that is legally privileged;
 that the employer may not disclose without contravening a law or court order,
 that is confidential and, if disclosed, may cause substantial harm to the employee or the employer; and
 private personal information relating to an employee (unless the employee has consented to the disclosure).

Disputes about disclosure of information must be referred to the Commission for Conciliation, Mediation and Arbitration. If parties fail to resolve the dispute through conciliation, any party to the dispute may request arbitration.

The Commissioner will not compel the employer to disclose "irrelevant" information.

Despite the potentially important influence that a forum may have on a workplace, few such forums are found in practice. This is due to employers' viewing fora as an inroad to managerial prerogative, and the concern of unions that fora will undermine collective bargaining structures.

Industrial action 
At the end of a collective-bargaining session or process, parties may either reach an agreement or fail to do so. If an agreement is reached, a collective agreement is concluded. If no agreement is reached, parties may agree on mediation or arbitration, or decide to exert pressure on each other through industrial action.

Industrial action, sometimes also called collective action, generally refers to employees acting together to force the hand of the employer, but employers, too, for the purposes of industrial action, employers may act individually or collectively with other employers to lock out employees. Industrial action for employees can take the form of strikes, secondary strikes, pickets and protest action, while employers have recourse to lock-outs.

Strikes and lock-outs are a reality in the workplace—"just like friction in a marriage is a reality." Conflict in the workplace—"and in a marriage"—is not necessarily negative:

It gives the parties an opportunity to reaffirm their different bargaining strengths and positions. Conflict becomes problematic only if matters get out of hand as a result of the power struggle. That will then undermine the purpose of the conflict.
Another problematic aspect of conflict is that once parties are in a stand-off, the matter will not be resolved without a "loser" and a "winner". In the long run, this may lead to a deterioration of the relationship and it may even spark further friction about other issues.

In the workplace, again "just like in a marriage," the law seeks "to ensure healthy and productive conflict that can lead to the resolution of matters of mutual interest." The LRA sets out the manner in which this is to be done by regulating various types of industrial action.

In the past few years, South Africa has seen a high level of industrial action. The Department of Labour has reported that working days lost to work stoppages in 2010 were the highest ever, with approximately 20,674,737 working days lost from about 74 work stoppages; in 2009, there were only 51.

The right to strike is clearly protected in South Africa through the Constitution, which guarantees that "every worker has the right [...] to strike." The Constitution does not give employers the right to lock out employees. Employers’ right to lock-out is implied in the Constitution's express protection of the right to bargain collectively. The LRA provides, however, in section 64(1), that every employee has the right to strike, and that every employer has recourse to a lock-out.

Neither the right to strike nor the right to a lock-out is directly protected in terms of an ILO Convention, but it is indirectly done through ILO Convention 87 and ILO Convention 98, which were both ratified by South Africa.

Both strikes and lock-outs are essential elements of collective bargaining, but "such rights should be used only as measures of last resort." Strikes are used by employees to back up their demands in promoting and defending their employment-related interests; lock-outs are used by employers to back up their employment-related demands.

In matters of industrial action, "it is important to know what type of action to take." Different types of industrial action serve different purposes. The purpose of the employer or the employees will determine the type of action to be taken:

 A strike is undertaken to remedy a grievance or resolve any matter of mutual interest between employees and employers.
 A secondary strike is a strike in support of another strike (known as the primary strike) in order to put pressure on the primary employer to accede to the demands of its striking employees.
 A picket is a peaceful demonstration of support for any protected strike, or of opposition to any lock-out.
 Protest action is undertaken to promote or defend the socioeconomic interests of workers.
 A lock-out is undertaken by an employer to compel its employees to accept a demand in respect of any matter of mutual interest between them.

Not only is it important to ensure that the right type of action is chosen; it is important "also to ensure that the action will be protected by the LRA." In the case of a protected strike or lock-out—it used to be called a "legal" strike or lock-out under the 1956 LRA—the parties taking part in the action are not guilty of breach of contract and cannot be dismissed for that reason. The court may not order an interdict to stop the action from continuing, and the participants in the industrial action will not be held liable for compensation for the work stoppage.

Hurdles in the way of protected industrial action 
No right is unlimited. Rights may be limited in the interests of society or by the rights of others. Section 36(1) of the Constitution provides for the limitation of rights in terms of law of general application. The LRA is such a law. It limits the right to strike.

Strikes and lock-outs are not automatically protected, as there are some hurdles that employees and employers have to cross before their actions will be protected:

 To cross the first hurdle, the parties should ensure that their action complies with the definition of a strike or a lock-out. They must therefore avoid the inherent limitations in the definitions of both strikes and lock-outs.
 To cross the second hurdle, the parties should comply with the procedure prescribed by the LRA in section 64. In certain limited circumstances, employers and employees will be exempted from complying with these procedures.
 To cross the third hurdle, the parties should ensure that none of the prohibitions against industrial action, as contained in section 65 of the LRA, are applicable to their issue in dispute. The parties will be able to continue with collective action only if the nature of the particular dispute between the parties allows it. For example, employees may go on strike only if the dispute is one of "interest," meaning a dispute about a change to an existing right or about creating a new right. Employees may not strike about a dispute of "right," which would be a dispute about the application and interpretation of an existing right, since these must be referred to arbitration. They are better suited to resolution by third-party determination than by industrial action.

Compliance with definition of "strike" or "lock-out" 
It is important that the actions taken by employees and employers fall within the definitions of a strike or a lock-out. Action that does not amount to a strike or a lock-out will not enjoy protection in terms of the LRA. This is the first hurdle to be crossed by employees and unions for a protected strike, and by employers for a protected lock-out. This hurdle stands on two legs:

 definition of a strike; and
 definition of a lock-out.

Definition of a strike 
"Strike" is defined as follows:

the partial or complete concerted refusal to work, or the retardation or obstruction of work, by persons who are or have been employed by the same employer or by different employers, for the purposes of remedying a grievance or resolving a dispute in respect of any matter of mutual interest between employer and employee and every reference to work in this definition includes overtime work, whether it is voluntary or compulsory.

Except for "protest action," any intentional refusal to work will amount to misconduct unless it can be regarded as strike action in terms of the above definition. In order to qualify as strike action, the employees must comply with the following three elements contained in the definition:

 there must be a refusal to work (a complete or partial retardation or obstruction of work);
 the refusal must be a concerted action by persons (employed by the same or different employers); and
 the refusal must be for the purpose of remedying a grievance or resolving a dispute in respect of any matter of mutual interest between an employer and an employee.

There must be a refusal to work in order for an action to qualify as a strike. This is the first hurdle that employees must cross. The refusal to work must be

 in relation to work which employees are contractually obliged to perform; and
 not contrary to the law or a collective agreement.

The action may be partial (in that the employees still perform some of their duties), or complete (in that the employees do not perform any of their duties), or the retardation of work (where employees work, but at a reduced pace), or obstruction of work (where employees disturb production through their actions). A refusal by employees to work overtime also constitutes a strike, whether the overtime is compulsory (required by a contract or by a collective agreement) or voluntary.

Although the Constitution grants individual workers the right to strike, the right itself cannot be exercised individually. The action must be

 "concerted;"
 "by persons;" and
 constitute collective action.

An individual employee cannot engage in a strike. More than one person must be involved in order for the action to constitute a strike. The action must be carried out by people acting together who are or have been employed by the same employer or by different employers (as in the case of an industry-wide strike). The action is thus directed at the employer or employers. If, for example, employees refuse to work because they have a demand against a union, that will not amount to strike action. An exception exists in respect of secondary strikes.

The refusal to work must be for the common purpose of remedying a grievance or resolving a dispute in respect of any matter of mutual interest between the employer and employee. A grievance or an issue in dispute in respect of a matter of mutual interest must exist, therefore, before an action may be deemed a strike. Where there is no grievance or dispute against the employer, there cannot be a strike. While the concept of "mutual interest" is not defined in the LRA, it was described as "whatever can be fairly and reasonably regarded as calculated to promote the well-being of the trade concerned."

Matters of mutual interest may include, for example,

 terms and conditions of employment;
 health and safety issues;
 the negotiation of disciplinary procedures; and
 wage increases.

An important indication that a matter is one of mutual interest would be that the matter can be dealt with through collective bargaining. For example, political issues or demands against the State do not qualify, unless the State is the employer and the demands relate to the State's role as employer. These political issues or demands should be dealt with by way of protest action.

Definition of a lock-out 
While employees have the right to strike in terms of the Constitution and the LRA, employers do not have a right to lock-out, but they do have recourse to a lock-out in terms of section 64 of the LRA.

"Lock-out" is defined as

the exclusion by an employer of employees from the employer’s workplace, for the purpose of compelling the employees to accept a demand in respect of any matter of mutual interest between employer and employee, whether or not the employer breaches those employees’ contracts of employment in the course of or for the purpose of that exclusion.

To constitute a lock-out, the employer's action must contain the following two elements:

 The employer must exclude employees from the workplace. This normally happens when the employer closes the workplace entrance or gates and refuses to permit employees to enter the premises. In practice, this allows the employer to refuse to pay the employees their remuneration. This is in line with the LRA, which states that the employer is not obliged to remunerate an employee for services not rendered during a protected strike or a protected lock-out. Put differently, the principle of "no work, no pay" applies. In terms of the definition of a lock-out, the employer cannot exclude only one employee; it must be a group of employees.
 The exclusion must be for the purpose of compelling the employees to accept a demand in any matter of mutual interest between employer and employees. If it is for a different purpose, the action will not constitute a lock-out and will be breach of contract. "Matters of mutual interest" with regard to strikes are also "matters of mutual interest" in the case of lock-outs.

Procedural requirements for protection of strikes and lock-outs in terms of section 64 
The second hurdle to be crossed in order for a strike or lock-out to be regarded as protected is that certain procedural requirements must be complied with. This hurdle stands on the three legs prescribed by section 64(1):

 the issue in dispute must be referred to the CCMA (Commission for Conciliation, Mediation and Arbitration) for conciliation;
 the CCMA must have issued a certificate to verify that the dispute has not yet been resolved.
 A written notice must be handed to the employer, employees or trade union at least 48 business hours prior to the commencement of the strike or lock-out.

The issue in dispute 
The LRA defines an "issue in dispute" as "the demand, the grievance, or the dispute that forms the subject matter of the strike or lock-out." The issue in dispute must fall within the definition of a strike (or lock-out). In other words, the demand, grievance or dispute about which the employees strike (or the employer locks out) must relate to a matter of mutual interest.

The LRA requires that parties must try to resolve the issue. It requires that the parties first refer the dispute to a bargaining council (if there is one for that sector). If no bargaining council exists, the dispute must be referred to the Commission for Conciliation, Mediation and Arbitration for conciliation.

Certificate of outcome 
The bargaining council or the Commission for Conciliation, Mediation and Arbitration must attempt to resolve the dispute through conciliation within thirty days of the referral. If the parties to the dispute reach an agreement, the dispute is resolved. If no agreement is reached, the conciliator must issue a certificate to indicate that the matter has not been resolved. After this (or after thirty days have gone by since referral of the dispute for conciliation), the parties can give notice of the proposed strike (or lock-out).

Prescribed notice 
If conciliation fails, or thirty days have passed since the referral of the dispute, at least 48 hours’ written notice must be given of the commencement of the strike or lock-out. If the State is the employer, at least seven days’ notice must be given. If the employer is a member of an employers’ organisation, notice must be given to the employers’ organisation.

In case of a proposed lock-out, the employer must give notice to the union involved in the dispute, or to the employees directly if there is no union.

The LRA does not prescribe what details the notice must contain; it only regulates that it must be in writing and must be issued 48 hours before commencement of the industrial action.

There are some exceptions, according to which, the parties do not need to follow the procedures prescribed by the LRA:

 if the parties to the dispute are members of a bargaining council and the dispute followed the procedure set by that council's constitution;
 if the parties concluded a collective agreement with prescribed procedures to be followed before they strike or lock-out, and they have complied with that agreement,
 if an employer implements an unprotected lock-out and the employees strike in response to that (and the same would apply if the employer locked-out the employees in response to an unprotected strike);
 if a strike takes place after the employer has unilaterally changed the terms and conditions of employment, and the employer fails to rectify this despite prior warning; and
 if an employer refuses to bargain with a union, in which case the dispute must first be referred for conciliation and then for advisory arbitration before notice of a strike can be given.

See also

Cases 
 Afrox Limited v SACWU & Others [1997] 4 BLLR 375 (LC).
 Council for Scientific and Industrial Research v Fijen 1996 (2) SA 1 (SCA).
 CWIU v Algorax (Pty) Ltd 2003 11 BLLR 1081 (LAC).
 David Crouch Marketing v Du Plessis (2009) 30 ILJ 1828 (LC); [2009] JOL 23835 (LC).
 Food and Allied Workers Union and Another v The Cold Chain (C324/06) [2007] ZALC 17 (8 March 2007).
 Fedlife Assurance v Wolfaardt (2001) 22 ILJ 2407 (SCA).
 Food & Nutritional Products (Pty) Ltd v Neumann 1986 (3) SA 464 (W).
 Fry's Metal v NUMSA [2003] 2 BLLR 140 (LAC).
 Fuel Retailers Association of SA v Motor Industry Bargaining Council (J2612/00) [2001] ZALC 46 (28 March 2001).
 Gallagher v Norman's Transport Lines (Pty) Ltd 1992 (3) SA 500 (W).
 Independent Municipal and Allied Trade Union v Rustenburg Transitional Council (J1543/98) [1999] ZALC 145; (2000) 21 ILJ 377 (LC) (17 September 1999).
 Jack v Director-General Department of Environmental Affairs [2002] JOL 10347 (LC).
 Kroukam v SA Airlink (JA3/2003) [2005] ZALAC 5; [2005] 12 ILJ 2153 (LAC) (26 September 2005).
 Luna Meubel Vevaardigers (EDMS) Bpk v Makin (t/a Makin's Furniture Manufacturers) 1977 (4) SA 135 (W).
 Mahlamu v CCMA [2011] 4 BLLR 381 (LC).
 Mashava v Cuzen & Woods Attorneys (2000) 21 ILJ 402 (LC).
 McInnes v Technikon Natal [2000] JOL 6389 (LC).
 Murray v Minister of Defence 2009 (3) SA 130 (SCA).
 NUM v CCMA [2009] 8 BLLR 777 (LC).
 NUMSA v Feltex Foam (1997) 18 ILJ 1404 (CCMA).
 National Union of Metal Workers of South Africa and Others v Bader Bop (Pty) Ltd and Another (CCT14/02) [2002] ZACC 30; 2003 (2) BCLR 182; 2003 (3) SA 513 (CC); [2003] 2 BLLR 103 (CC); (2002) 23 lU 104 (LAC) (13 December 2002).
 Organisation of Labour Affairs (OLA) v Old Mutual Life Assurance Company [2003] 9 BALR 1052 (CCMA).
 Ouwehand v Hout Bay Fishing Industries (2004) 25 ILJ 731 (LC).
 Pressma Services (Pty) Ltd v Schuttler and Another 1990 (2) SA 411 (C).
 SACTWU v Marley (SA) (Pty) Ltd (2000) 21 ILJ 425.
 SA Post Office Ltd v Mampeule [2009] 8 BLLR 792 (LC).
 SA Rugby (Pty) Ltd v CCMA & Others [2006] 1 BLLR 27 (LC).
 Sindane v Prestige Cleaning Services [2009] 12 BLLR 1249 (LC).
 South African National Defence Union v Minister of Defence (CCT27/98) [1999] ZACC 7; 1999 (4) SA 469; 1999 (6) BCLR 615; (1999) ILJ 2265 (CC) (26 May 1999).
 South African National Defence Union v Minister of Defence and Others (CCT65/06) [2007] ZACC 10; 2007 (5) SA 400; 2007 (8) BCLR 863 (CC); [2007] 9 BLLR 785 (CC); (2007) 28 ILJ 1909 (CC) (30 May 2007).
 Syfrets Mortgage Nominees Ltd v Cape St Francis Hotels (Pty) Ltd 1991 (3) SA 276 (SE).
 UPUSA v Komming Knitting [1997] 4 BLLR 508 (CCMA).
 Venture Capital Ltd v Mauerberger 1991 (1) SA 96 (W).
 Wallach v Lew Geffen Estates CC 1993 (3) SA 258 (A).
 Whitehead v Woolworths (Pty) Ltd [1999] JOL 5162 (LC).
 Yorigami Maritime Construction Co Ltd v Nissho-Iwai Co Ltd 1977 (4) SA 682 (C).

Legislation 
 Basic Conditions of Employment Act, 1997.
 Employment Equity Act, 1998.
 Native Building Workers Act, 1951.
 Industrial Conciliation Act, 1956.
 Unemployment Insurance Act 63 of 2001.

Notes

References 
 M McGregor and NP Laqwela (eds). Labour Law Rules! Siber Ink, 2012.